

525001–525100 

|-bgcolor=#fefefe
| 525001 ||  || — || September 8, 2004 || Socorro || LINEAR ||  || align=right data-sort-value="0.57" | 570 m || 
|-id=002 bgcolor=#E9E9E9
| 525002 ||  || — || September 8, 2004 || Socorro || LINEAR ||  || align=right | 1.9 km || 
|-id=003 bgcolor=#fefefe
| 525003 ||  || — || September 8, 2004 || Socorro || LINEAR ||  || align=right data-sort-value="0.65" | 650 m || 
|-id=004 bgcolor=#E9E9E9
| 525004 ||  || — || September 8, 2004 || Socorro || LINEAR ||  || align=right data-sort-value="0.88" | 880 m || 
|-id=005 bgcolor=#E9E9E9
| 525005 ||  || — || September 8, 2004 || Socorro || LINEAR ||  || align=right | 2.5 km || 
|-id=006 bgcolor=#E9E9E9
| 525006 ||  || — || September 7, 2004 || Palomar || NEAT ||  || align=right | 1.6 km || 
|-id=007 bgcolor=#E9E9E9
| 525007 ||  || — || September 8, 2004 || Socorro || LINEAR ||  || align=right | 1.9 km || 
|-id=008 bgcolor=#E9E9E9
| 525008 ||  || — || September 8, 2004 || Socorro || LINEAR ||  || align=right | 1.0 km || 
|-id=009 bgcolor=#FA8072
| 525009 ||  || — || August 26, 2004 || Socorro || LINEAR ||  || align=right | 1.2 km || 
|-id=010 bgcolor=#E9E9E9
| 525010 ||  || — || September 7, 2004 || Kitt Peak || Spacewatch ||  || align=right | 1.5 km || 
|-id=011 bgcolor=#E9E9E9
| 525011 ||  || — || September 7, 2004 || Kitt Peak || Spacewatch ||  || align=right | 1.4 km || 
|-id=012 bgcolor=#E9E9E9
| 525012 ||  || — || September 7, 2004 || Kitt Peak || Spacewatch ||  || align=right | 1.9 km || 
|-id=013 bgcolor=#E9E9E9
| 525013 ||  || — || September 7, 2004 || Kitt Peak || Spacewatch ||  || align=right | 1.8 km || 
|-id=014 bgcolor=#d6d6d6
| 525014 ||  || — || September 7, 2004 || Kitt Peak || Spacewatch ||  || align=right | 2.3 km || 
|-id=015 bgcolor=#E9E9E9
| 525015 ||  || — || September 7, 2004 || Kitt Peak || Spacewatch ||  || align=right | 1.6 km || 
|-id=016 bgcolor=#fefefe
| 525016 ||  || — || September 7, 2004 || Kitt Peak || Spacewatch ||  || align=right data-sort-value="0.58" | 580 m || 
|-id=017 bgcolor=#E9E9E9
| 525017 ||  || — || September 7, 2004 || Kitt Peak || Spacewatch ||  || align=right data-sort-value="0.87" | 870 m || 
|-id=018 bgcolor=#E9E9E9
| 525018 ||  || — || September 7, 2004 || Kitt Peak || Spacewatch ||  || align=right | 1.7 km || 
|-id=019 bgcolor=#E9E9E9
| 525019 ||  || — || September 7, 2004 || Kitt Peak || Spacewatch ||  || align=right data-sort-value="0.91" | 910 m || 
|-id=020 bgcolor=#E9E9E9
| 525020 ||  || — || September 8, 2004 || Socorro || LINEAR ||  || align=right | 1.9 km || 
|-id=021 bgcolor=#E9E9E9
| 525021 ||  || — || September 8, 2004 || Socorro || LINEAR ||  || align=right | 1.7 km || 
|-id=022 bgcolor=#fefefe
| 525022 ||  || — || September 9, 2004 || Socorro || LINEAR ||  || align=right data-sort-value="0.88" | 880 m || 
|-id=023 bgcolor=#E9E9E9
| 525023 ||  || — || September 9, 2004 || Socorro || LINEAR ||  || align=right | 2.2 km || 
|-id=024 bgcolor=#E9E9E9
| 525024 ||  || — || September 9, 2004 || Socorro || LINEAR ||  || align=right | 1.5 km || 
|-id=025 bgcolor=#fefefe
| 525025 ||  || — || August 21, 2004 || Catalina || CSS ||  || align=right data-sort-value="0.57" | 570 m || 
|-id=026 bgcolor=#E9E9E9
| 525026 ||  || — || August 18, 2004 || Siding Spring || SSS ||  || align=right | 1.5 km || 
|-id=027 bgcolor=#fefefe
| 525027 ||  || — || August 20, 2004 || Catalina || CSS || PHO || align=right | 1.1 km || 
|-id=028 bgcolor=#E9E9E9
| 525028 ||  || — || September 7, 2004 || Kitt Peak || Spacewatch ||  || align=right data-sort-value="0.78" | 780 m || 
|-id=029 bgcolor=#d6d6d6
| 525029 ||  || — || September 7, 2004 || Kitt Peak || Spacewatch ||  || align=right | 3.2 km || 
|-id=030 bgcolor=#E9E9E9
| 525030 ||  || — || September 7, 2004 || Socorro || LINEAR ||  || align=right | 1.2 km || 
|-id=031 bgcolor=#E9E9E9
| 525031 ||  || — || September 10, 2004 || Socorro || LINEAR ||  || align=right | 1.5 km || 
|-id=032 bgcolor=#E9E9E9
| 525032 ||  || — || August 10, 2004 || Socorro || LINEAR ||  || align=right | 2.5 km || 
|-id=033 bgcolor=#FA8072
| 525033 ||  || — || September 10, 2004 || Socorro || LINEAR ||  || align=right | 1.3 km || 
|-id=034 bgcolor=#E9E9E9
| 525034 ||  || — || August 19, 2004 || Socorro || LINEAR ||  || align=right | 1.8 km || 
|-id=035 bgcolor=#d6d6d6
| 525035 ||  || — || September 12, 2004 || Kitt Peak || Spacewatch ||  || align=right | 2.8 km || 
|-id=036 bgcolor=#E9E9E9
| 525036 ||  || — || September 11, 2004 || Socorro || LINEAR ||  || align=right | 3.1 km || 
|-id=037 bgcolor=#E9E9E9
| 525037 ||  || — || September 7, 2004 || Socorro || LINEAR ||  || align=right | 1.2 km || 
|-id=038 bgcolor=#E9E9E9
| 525038 ||  || — || September 9, 2004 || Socorro || LINEAR ||  || align=right | 1.5 km || 
|-id=039 bgcolor=#E9E9E9
| 525039 ||  || — || September 9, 2004 || Kitt Peak || Spacewatch ||  || align=right | 1.8 km || 
|-id=040 bgcolor=#d6d6d6
| 525040 ||  || — || September 9, 2004 || Kitt Peak || Spacewatch ||  || align=right | 2.1 km || 
|-id=041 bgcolor=#E9E9E9
| 525041 ||  || — || September 10, 2004 || Kitt Peak || Spacewatch ||  || align=right data-sort-value="0.91" | 910 m || 
|-id=042 bgcolor=#E9E9E9
| 525042 ||  || — || September 10, 2004 || Kitt Peak || Spacewatch ||  || align=right | 1.3 km || 
|-id=043 bgcolor=#d6d6d6
| 525043 ||  || — || September 10, 2004 || Kitt Peak || Spacewatch ||  || align=right | 2.4 km || 
|-id=044 bgcolor=#fefefe
| 525044 ||  || — || September 10, 2004 || Kitt Peak || Spacewatch ||  || align=right data-sort-value="0.65" | 650 m || 
|-id=045 bgcolor=#fefefe
| 525045 ||  || — || September 7, 2004 || Socorro || LINEAR ||  || align=right data-sort-value="0.92" | 920 m || 
|-id=046 bgcolor=#E9E9E9
| 525046 ||  || — || September 10, 2004 || Socorro || LINEAR ||  || align=right | 2.0 km || 
|-id=047 bgcolor=#fefefe
| 525047 ||  || — || September 15, 2004 || Siding Spring || SSS || H || align=right data-sort-value="0.80" | 800 m || 
|-id=048 bgcolor=#E9E9E9
| 525048 ||  || — || September 9, 2004 || Socorro || LINEAR ||  || align=right | 1.4 km || 
|-id=049 bgcolor=#E9E9E9
| 525049 ||  || — || September 11, 2004 || Kitt Peak || Spacewatch || DOR || align=right | 1.9 km || 
|-id=050 bgcolor=#fefefe
| 525050 ||  || — || August 23, 2004 || Kitt Peak || Spacewatch || H || align=right data-sort-value="0.62" | 620 m || 
|-id=051 bgcolor=#fefefe
| 525051 ||  || — || September 15, 2004 || Kitt Peak || Spacewatch ||  || align=right data-sort-value="0.67" | 670 m || 
|-id=052 bgcolor=#fefefe
| 525052 ||  || — || September 15, 2004 || Kitt Peak || Spacewatch ||  || align=right data-sort-value="0.58" | 580 m || 
|-id=053 bgcolor=#E9E9E9
| 525053 ||  || — || September 11, 2004 || Kitt Peak || Spacewatch ||  || align=right | 1.2 km || 
|-id=054 bgcolor=#fefefe
| 525054 ||  || — || September 11, 2004 || Kitt Peak || Spacewatch ||  || align=right data-sort-value="0.51" | 510 m || 
|-id=055 bgcolor=#E9E9E9
| 525055 ||  || — || September 11, 2004 || Kitt Peak || Spacewatch ||  || align=right data-sort-value="0.77" | 770 m || 
|-id=056 bgcolor=#d6d6d6
| 525056 ||  || — || September 12, 2004 || Kitt Peak || Spacewatch ||  || align=right | 1.9 km || 
|-id=057 bgcolor=#fefefe
| 525057 ||  || — || September 13, 2004 || Socorro || LINEAR ||  || align=right data-sort-value="0.68" | 680 m || 
|-id=058 bgcolor=#fefefe
| 525058 ||  || — || September 15, 2004 || Kitt Peak || Spacewatch ||  || align=right data-sort-value="0.56" | 560 m || 
|-id=059 bgcolor=#E9E9E9
| 525059 ||  || — || September 12, 2004 || Kitt Peak || Spacewatch ||  || align=right | 2.3 km || 
|-id=060 bgcolor=#d6d6d6
| 525060 ||  || — || September 12, 2004 || Kitt Peak || Spacewatch ||  || align=right | 3.0 km || 
|-id=061 bgcolor=#fefefe
| 525061 ||  || — || September 13, 2004 || Socorro || LINEAR ||  || align=right data-sort-value="0.86" | 860 m || 
|-id=062 bgcolor=#fefefe
| 525062 ||  || — || September 13, 2004 || Socorro || LINEAR || (2076) || align=right data-sort-value="0.75" | 750 m || 
|-id=063 bgcolor=#E9E9E9
| 525063 ||  || — || September 13, 2004 || Socorro || LINEAR ||  || align=right data-sort-value="0.94" | 940 m || 
|-id=064 bgcolor=#E9E9E9
| 525064 ||  || — || September 13, 2004 || Socorro || LINEAR ||  || align=right | 1.8 km || 
|-id=065 bgcolor=#fefefe
| 525065 ||  || — || September 13, 2004 || Socorro || LINEAR ||  || align=right data-sort-value="0.68" | 680 m || 
|-id=066 bgcolor=#E9E9E9
| 525066 ||  || — || September 15, 2004 || Kitt Peak || Spacewatch ||  || align=right | 2.2 km || 
|-id=067 bgcolor=#d6d6d6
| 525067 ||  || — || September 15, 2004 || Anderson Mesa || LONEOS ||  || align=right | 3.1 km || 
|-id=068 bgcolor=#d6d6d6
| 525068 ||  || — || September 15, 2004 || Anderson Mesa || LONEOS ||  || align=right | 3.3 km || 
|-id=069 bgcolor=#fefefe
| 525069 ||  || — || September 15, 2004 || Kitt Peak || Spacewatch ||  || align=right data-sort-value="0.47" | 470 m || 
|-id=070 bgcolor=#E9E9E9
| 525070 ||  || — || September 11, 2004 || Kitt Peak || Spacewatch ||  || align=right | 1.4 km || 
|-id=071 bgcolor=#fefefe
| 525071 ||  || — || September 11, 2004 || Kitt Peak || Spacewatch ||  || align=right data-sort-value="0.67" | 670 m || 
|-id=072 bgcolor=#E9E9E9
| 525072 ||  || — || September 11, 2004 || Kitt Peak || Spacewatch ||  || align=right | 1.4 km || 
|-id=073 bgcolor=#fefefe
| 525073 ||  || — || September 16, 2004 || Socorro || LINEAR || PHO || align=right | 2.7 km || 
|-id=074 bgcolor=#E9E9E9
| 525074 ||  || — || September 17, 2004 || Kitt Peak || Spacewatch ||  || align=right | 1.2 km || 
|-id=075 bgcolor=#fefefe
| 525075 ||  || — || September 17, 2004 || Kitt Peak || Spacewatch ||  || align=right data-sort-value="0.72" | 720 m || 
|-id=076 bgcolor=#d6d6d6
| 525076 ||  || — || September 17, 2004 || Socorro || LINEAR ||  || align=right | 3.3 km || 
|-id=077 bgcolor=#fefefe
| 525077 ||  || — || September 17, 2004 || Socorro || LINEAR ||  || align=right data-sort-value="0.67" | 670 m || 
|-id=078 bgcolor=#E9E9E9
| 525078 ||  || — || September 17, 2004 || Anderson Mesa || LONEOS ||  || align=right | 2.2 km || 
|-id=079 bgcolor=#E9E9E9
| 525079 ||  || — || September 17, 2004 || Anderson Mesa || LONEOS ||  || align=right | 1.1 km || 
|-id=080 bgcolor=#E9E9E9
| 525080 ||  || — || September 17, 2004 || Anderson Mesa || LONEOS ||  || align=right | 1.9 km || 
|-id=081 bgcolor=#fefefe
| 525081 ||  || — || September 18, 2004 || Socorro || LINEAR || H || align=right data-sort-value="0.82" | 820 m || 
|-id=082 bgcolor=#E9E9E9
| 525082 ||  || — || October 23, 2009 || Mount Lemmon || Mount Lemmon Survey ||  || align=right | 1.8 km || 
|-id=083 bgcolor=#fefefe
| 525083 ||  || — || September 21, 2004 || Kitt Peak || Spacewatch ||  || align=right data-sort-value="0.62" | 620 m || 
|-id=084 bgcolor=#E9E9E9
| 525084 ||  || — || September 21, 2004 || Socorro || LINEAR ||  || align=right | 2.9 km || 
|-id=085 bgcolor=#fefefe
| 525085 ||  || — || September 16, 2004 || Kitt Peak || Spacewatch ||  || align=right data-sort-value="0.62" | 620 m || 
|-id=086 bgcolor=#E9E9E9
| 525086 ||  || — || September 17, 2004 || Socorro || LINEAR ||  || align=right | 1.5 km || 
|-id=087 bgcolor=#E9E9E9
| 525087 ||  || — || September 13, 2004 || Anderson Mesa || LONEOS ||  || align=right | 1.8 km || 
|-id=088 bgcolor=#E9E9E9
| 525088 ||  || — || September 17, 2004 || Kitt Peak || Spacewatch ||  || align=right data-sort-value="0.87" | 870 m || 
|-id=089 bgcolor=#d6d6d6
| 525089 ||  || — || September 9, 2004 || Kitt Peak || Spacewatch ||  || align=right | 2.6 km || 
|-id=090 bgcolor=#fefefe
| 525090 ||  || — || September 18, 2004 || Socorro || LINEAR || H || align=right data-sort-value="0.64" | 640 m || 
|-id=091 bgcolor=#fefefe
| 525091 ||  || — || August 26, 2004 || Siding Spring || SSS ||  || align=right data-sort-value="0.80" | 800 m || 
|-id=092 bgcolor=#E9E9E9
| 525092 ||  || — || September 23, 2004 || Kitt Peak || Spacewatch ||  || align=right | 1.2 km || 
|-id=093 bgcolor=#E9E9E9
| 525093 ||  || — || September 22, 2004 || Socorro || LINEAR ||  || align=right | 1.5 km || 
|-id=094 bgcolor=#fefefe
| 525094 ||  || — || September 22, 2004 || Kitt Peak || Spacewatch ||  || align=right data-sort-value="0.49" | 490 m || 
|-id=095 bgcolor=#FA8072
| 525095 ||  || — || October 8, 2004 || Socorro || LINEAR ||  || align=right data-sort-value="0.78" | 780 m || 
|-id=096 bgcolor=#E9E9E9
| 525096 ||  || — || September 11, 2004 || Socorro || LINEAR ||  || align=right | 2.6 km || 
|-id=097 bgcolor=#fefefe
| 525097 ||  || — || October 10, 2004 || Socorro || LINEAR || H || align=right data-sort-value="0.67" | 670 m || 
|-id=098 bgcolor=#FA8072
| 525098 ||  || — || September 21, 2004 || Anderson Mesa || LONEOS ||  || align=right | 2.0 km || 
|-id=099 bgcolor=#E9E9E9
| 525099 ||  || — || October 4, 2004 || Kitt Peak || Spacewatch ||  || align=right | 1.5 km || 
|-id=100 bgcolor=#E9E9E9
| 525100 ||  || — || October 4, 2004 || Kitt Peak || Spacewatch ||  || align=right | 1.3 km || 
|}

525101–525200 

|-bgcolor=#E9E9E9
| 525101 ||  || — || October 4, 2004 || Kitt Peak || Spacewatch ||  || align=right | 1.9 km || 
|-id=102 bgcolor=#fefefe
| 525102 ||  || — || October 4, 2004 || Kitt Peak || Spacewatch ||  || align=right data-sort-value="0.62" | 620 m || 
|-id=103 bgcolor=#fefefe
| 525103 ||  || — || October 4, 2004 || Kitt Peak || Spacewatch ||  || align=right data-sort-value="0.94" | 940 m || 
|-id=104 bgcolor=#E9E9E9
| 525104 ||  || — || October 4, 2004 || Kitt Peak || Spacewatch || DOR || align=right | 1.9 km || 
|-id=105 bgcolor=#E9E9E9
| 525105 ||  || — || September 24, 2004 || Kitt Peak || Spacewatch ||  || align=right | 1.3 km || 
|-id=106 bgcolor=#d6d6d6
| 525106 ||  || — || September 17, 2004 || Socorro || LINEAR ||  || align=right | 2.9 km || 
|-id=107 bgcolor=#E9E9E9
| 525107 ||  || — || October 5, 2004 || Kitt Peak || Spacewatch ||  || align=right | 1.1 km || 
|-id=108 bgcolor=#E9E9E9
| 525108 ||  || — || October 5, 2004 || Anderson Mesa || LONEOS ||  || align=right | 1.5 km || 
|-id=109 bgcolor=#E9E9E9
| 525109 ||  || — || October 5, 2004 || Kitt Peak || Spacewatch ||  || align=right | 2.7 km || 
|-id=110 bgcolor=#fefefe
| 525110 ||  || — || August 23, 2004 || Siding Spring || SSS ||  || align=right data-sort-value="0.66" | 660 m || 
|-id=111 bgcolor=#fefefe
| 525111 ||  || — || October 6, 2004 || Kitt Peak || Spacewatch ||  || align=right data-sort-value="0.62" | 620 m || 
|-id=112 bgcolor=#fefefe
| 525112 ||  || — || October 6, 2004 || Kitt Peak || Spacewatch ||  || align=right data-sort-value="0.72" | 720 m || 
|-id=113 bgcolor=#E9E9E9
| 525113 ||  || — || October 7, 2004 || Socorro || LINEAR ||  || align=right | 1.5 km || 
|-id=114 bgcolor=#fefefe
| 525114 ||  || — || October 7, 2004 || Socorro || LINEAR ||  || align=right data-sort-value="0.70" | 700 m || 
|-id=115 bgcolor=#E9E9E9
| 525115 ||  || — || October 5, 2004 || Kitt Peak || Spacewatch ||  || align=right | 2.0 km || 
|-id=116 bgcolor=#fefefe
| 525116 ||  || — || September 24, 2004 || Kitt Peak || Spacewatch ||  || align=right data-sort-value="0.54" | 540 m || 
|-id=117 bgcolor=#d6d6d6
| 525117 ||  || — || October 5, 2004 || Kitt Peak || Spacewatch ||  || align=right | 2.8 km || 
|-id=118 bgcolor=#E9E9E9
| 525118 ||  || — || October 5, 2004 || Kitt Peak || Spacewatch ||  || align=right | 2.9 km || 
|-id=119 bgcolor=#E9E9E9
| 525119 ||  || — || September 17, 2004 || Kitt Peak || Spacewatch ||  || align=right | 1.7 km || 
|-id=120 bgcolor=#E9E9E9
| 525120 ||  || — || October 5, 2004 || Kitt Peak || Spacewatch ||  || align=right | 2.5 km || 
|-id=121 bgcolor=#E9E9E9
| 525121 ||  || — || October 5, 2004 || Kitt Peak || Spacewatch ||  || align=right | 1.3 km || 
|-id=122 bgcolor=#fefefe
| 525122 ||  || — || October 5, 2004 || Kitt Peak || Spacewatch ||  || align=right data-sort-value="0.54" | 540 m || 
|-id=123 bgcolor=#fefefe
| 525123 ||  || — || October 5, 2004 || Kitt Peak || Spacewatch ||  || align=right data-sort-value="0.48" | 480 m || 
|-id=124 bgcolor=#E9E9E9
| 525124 ||  || — || October 5, 2004 || Kitt Peak || Spacewatch ||  || align=right | 1.8 km || 
|-id=125 bgcolor=#E9E9E9
| 525125 ||  || — || August 11, 2004 || Socorro || LINEAR ||  || align=right | 1.1 km || 
|-id=126 bgcolor=#d6d6d6
| 525126 ||  || — || October 7, 2004 || Kitt Peak || Spacewatch ||  || align=right | 2.3 km || 
|-id=127 bgcolor=#E9E9E9
| 525127 ||  || — || October 7, 2004 || Kitt Peak || Spacewatch ||  || align=right | 2.1 km || 
|-id=128 bgcolor=#E9E9E9
| 525128 ||  || — || October 7, 2004 || Socorro || LINEAR ||  || align=right | 1.8 km || 
|-id=129 bgcolor=#E9E9E9
| 525129 ||  || — || October 7, 2004 || Anderson Mesa || LONEOS ||  || align=right | 2.2 km || 
|-id=130 bgcolor=#E9E9E9
| 525130 ||  || — || October 7, 2004 || Kitt Peak || Spacewatch ||  || align=right data-sort-value="0.92" | 920 m || 
|-id=131 bgcolor=#fefefe
| 525131 ||  || — || October 7, 2004 || Anderson Mesa || LONEOS ||  || align=right data-sort-value="0.57" | 570 m || 
|-id=132 bgcolor=#fefefe
| 525132 ||  || — || October 7, 2004 || Socorro || LINEAR ||  || align=right data-sort-value="0.62" | 620 m || 
|-id=133 bgcolor=#E9E9E9
| 525133 ||  || — || September 9, 2004 || Socorro || LINEAR ||  || align=right | 1.9 km || 
|-id=134 bgcolor=#fefefe
| 525134 ||  || — || October 8, 2004 || Anderson Mesa || LONEOS ||  || align=right data-sort-value="0.65" | 650 m || 
|-id=135 bgcolor=#E9E9E9
| 525135 ||  || — || September 9, 2004 || Kitt Peak || Spacewatch ||  || align=right data-sort-value="0.94" | 940 m || 
|-id=136 bgcolor=#fefefe
| 525136 ||  || — || October 4, 2004 || Kitt Peak || Spacewatch || H || align=right data-sort-value="0.64" | 640 m || 
|-id=137 bgcolor=#E9E9E9
| 525137 ||  || — || October 6, 2004 || Kitt Peak || Spacewatch ||  || align=right | 1.5 km || 
|-id=138 bgcolor=#E9E9E9
| 525138 ||  || — || September 23, 2004 || Kitt Peak || Spacewatch ||  || align=right | 1.5 km || 
|-id=139 bgcolor=#E9E9E9
| 525139 ||  || — || September 23, 2004 || Kitt Peak || Spacewatch || EUN || align=right | 1.0 km || 
|-id=140 bgcolor=#E9E9E9
| 525140 ||  || — || October 6, 2004 || Kitt Peak || Spacewatch ||  || align=right | 1.9 km || 
|-id=141 bgcolor=#d6d6d6
| 525141 ||  || — || September 9, 2004 || Kitt Peak || Spacewatch ||  || align=right | 3.4 km || 
|-id=142 bgcolor=#E9E9E9
| 525142 ||  || — || September 10, 2004 || Kitt Peak || Spacewatch ||  || align=right | 1.2 km || 
|-id=143 bgcolor=#E9E9E9
| 525143 ||  || — || October 6, 2004 || Kitt Peak || Spacewatch ||  || align=right | 2.2 km || 
|-id=144 bgcolor=#fefefe
| 525144 ||  || — || October 6, 2004 || Kitt Peak || Spacewatch ||  || align=right data-sort-value="0.57" | 570 m || 
|-id=145 bgcolor=#E9E9E9
| 525145 ||  || — || October 6, 2004 || Kitt Peak || Spacewatch ||  || align=right | 1.0 km || 
|-id=146 bgcolor=#fefefe
| 525146 ||  || — || October 6, 2004 || Kitt Peak || Spacewatch ||  || align=right data-sort-value="0.56" | 560 m || 
|-id=147 bgcolor=#fefefe
| 525147 ||  || — || October 6, 2004 || Kitt Peak || Spacewatch ||  || align=right data-sort-value="0.43" | 430 m || 
|-id=148 bgcolor=#E9E9E9
| 525148 ||  || — || October 7, 2004 || Kitt Peak || Spacewatch ||  || align=right data-sort-value="0.81" | 810 m || 
|-id=149 bgcolor=#E9E9E9
| 525149 ||  || — || October 7, 2004 || Kitt Peak || Spacewatch ||  || align=right | 1.6 km || 
|-id=150 bgcolor=#d6d6d6
| 525150 ||  || — || October 7, 2004 || Kitt Peak || Spacewatch ||  || align=right | 2.6 km || 
|-id=151 bgcolor=#E9E9E9
| 525151 ||  || — || October 7, 2004 || Kitt Peak || Spacewatch ||  || align=right data-sort-value="0.87" | 870 m || 
|-id=152 bgcolor=#E9E9E9
| 525152 ||  || — || October 7, 2004 || Kitt Peak || Spacewatch ||  || align=right | 1.6 km || 
|-id=153 bgcolor=#fefefe
| 525153 ||  || — || September 10, 2004 || Kitt Peak || Spacewatch ||  || align=right data-sort-value="0.66" | 660 m || 
|-id=154 bgcolor=#E9E9E9
| 525154 ||  || — || October 7, 2004 || Kitt Peak || Spacewatch ||  || align=right | 1.7 km || 
|-id=155 bgcolor=#fefefe
| 525155 ||  || — || September 10, 2004 || Kitt Peak || Spacewatch || V || align=right data-sort-value="0.52" | 520 m || 
|-id=156 bgcolor=#E9E9E9
| 525156 ||  || — || October 7, 2004 || Kitt Peak || Spacewatch || DOR || align=right | 2.1 km || 
|-id=157 bgcolor=#E9E9E9
| 525157 ||  || — || October 7, 2004 || Kitt Peak || Spacewatch ||  || align=right | 1.1 km || 
|-id=158 bgcolor=#E9E9E9
| 525158 ||  || — || October 7, 2004 || Kitt Peak || Spacewatch ||  || align=right | 1.4 km || 
|-id=159 bgcolor=#fefefe
| 525159 ||  || — || October 7, 2004 || Kitt Peak || Spacewatch ||  || align=right data-sort-value="0.59" | 590 m || 
|-id=160 bgcolor=#E9E9E9
| 525160 ||  || — || October 7, 2004 || Kitt Peak || Spacewatch ||  || align=right data-sort-value="0.94" | 940 m || 
|-id=161 bgcolor=#d6d6d6
| 525161 ||  || — || October 7, 2004 || Kitt Peak || Spacewatch ||  || align=right | 2.4 km || 
|-id=162 bgcolor=#E9E9E9
| 525162 ||  || — || October 7, 2004 || Kitt Peak || Spacewatch ||  || align=right | 1.8 km || 
|-id=163 bgcolor=#E9E9E9
| 525163 ||  || — || October 7, 2004 || Kitt Peak || Spacewatch || GEF || align=right data-sort-value="0.94" | 940 m || 
|-id=164 bgcolor=#fefefe
| 525164 ||  || — || October 7, 2004 || Kitt Peak || Spacewatch ||  || align=right data-sort-value="0.65" | 650 m || 
|-id=165 bgcolor=#fefefe
| 525165 ||  || — || October 7, 2004 || Kitt Peak || Spacewatch ||  || align=right data-sort-value="0.63" | 630 m || 
|-id=166 bgcolor=#E9E9E9
| 525166 ||  || — || October 8, 2004 || Kitt Peak || Spacewatch || GEF || align=right | 1.1 km || 
|-id=167 bgcolor=#E9E9E9
| 525167 ||  || — || October 8, 2004 || Kitt Peak || Spacewatch ||  || align=right | 1.6 km || 
|-id=168 bgcolor=#d6d6d6
| 525168 ||  || — || October 9, 2004 || Kitt Peak || Spacewatch ||  || align=right | 3.3 km || 
|-id=169 bgcolor=#fefefe
| 525169 ||  || — || October 9, 2004 || Socorro || LINEAR ||  || align=right | 2.1 km || 
|-id=170 bgcolor=#d6d6d6
| 525170 ||  || — || October 5, 2004 || Kitt Peak || Spacewatch || 7:4 || align=right | 4.6 km || 
|-id=171 bgcolor=#fefefe
| 525171 ||  || — || October 5, 2004 || Kitt Peak || Spacewatch ||  || align=right data-sort-value="0.57" | 570 m || 
|-id=172 bgcolor=#fefefe
| 525172 ||  || — || October 5, 2004 || Kitt Peak || Spacewatch ||  || align=right data-sort-value="0.70" | 700 m || 
|-id=173 bgcolor=#d6d6d6
| 525173 ||  || — || September 7, 2004 || Kitt Peak || Spacewatch ||  || align=right | 3.4 km || 
|-id=174 bgcolor=#fefefe
| 525174 ||  || — || March 10, 2003 || Anderson Mesa || LONEOS ||  || align=right data-sort-value="0.85" | 850 m || 
|-id=175 bgcolor=#E9E9E9
| 525175 ||  || — || September 29, 1995 || Kitt Peak || Spacewatch || AEO || align=right | 1.1 km || 
|-id=176 bgcolor=#E9E9E9
| 525176 ||  || — || October 8, 2004 || Kitt Peak || Spacewatch ||  || align=right | 2.0 km || 
|-id=177 bgcolor=#E9E9E9
| 525177 ||  || — || October 8, 2004 || Kitt Peak || Spacewatch ||  || align=right | 2.1 km || 
|-id=178 bgcolor=#fefefe
| 525178 ||  || — || November 1, 1997 || Kitt Peak || Spacewatch ||  || align=right data-sort-value="0.66" | 660 m || 
|-id=179 bgcolor=#E9E9E9
| 525179 ||  || — || October 7, 2004 || Kitt Peak || Spacewatch ||  || align=right | 1.4 km || 
|-id=180 bgcolor=#E9E9E9
| 525180 ||  || — || October 7, 2004 || Kitt Peak || Spacewatch ||  || align=right | 2.2 km || 
|-id=181 bgcolor=#E9E9E9
| 525181 ||  || — || October 7, 2004 || Kitt Peak || Spacewatch ||  || align=right | 1.6 km || 
|-id=182 bgcolor=#E9E9E9
| 525182 ||  || — || October 7, 2004 || Kitt Peak || Spacewatch ||  || align=right | 1.9 km || 
|-id=183 bgcolor=#fefefe
| 525183 ||  || — || October 7, 2004 || Kitt Peak || Spacewatch ||  || align=right data-sort-value="0.72" | 720 m || 
|-id=184 bgcolor=#fefefe
| 525184 ||  || — || October 7, 2004 || Kitt Peak || Spacewatch ||  || align=right data-sort-value="0.56" | 560 m || 
|-id=185 bgcolor=#E9E9E9
| 525185 ||  || — || October 7, 2004 || Kitt Peak || Spacewatch ||  || align=right | 2.1 km || 
|-id=186 bgcolor=#d6d6d6
| 525186 ||  || — || October 9, 2004 || Kitt Peak || Spacewatch ||  || align=right | 3.3 km || 
|-id=187 bgcolor=#E9E9E9
| 525187 ||  || — || October 9, 2004 || Kitt Peak || Spacewatch ||  || align=right | 2.2 km || 
|-id=188 bgcolor=#E9E9E9
| 525188 ||  || — || October 9, 2004 || Kitt Peak || Spacewatch ||  || align=right | 1.9 km || 
|-id=189 bgcolor=#E9E9E9
| 525189 ||  || — || October 9, 2004 || Socorro || LINEAR ||  || align=right | 2.1 km || 
|-id=190 bgcolor=#E9E9E9
| 525190 ||  || — || October 9, 2004 || Kitt Peak || Spacewatch ||  || align=right | 2.4 km || 
|-id=191 bgcolor=#E9E9E9
| 525191 ||  || — || October 9, 2004 || Kitt Peak || Spacewatch ||  || align=right | 1.3 km || 
|-id=192 bgcolor=#fefefe
| 525192 ||  || — || October 9, 2004 || Kitt Peak || Spacewatch ||  || align=right data-sort-value="0.61" | 610 m || 
|-id=193 bgcolor=#E9E9E9
| 525193 ||  || — || October 9, 2004 || Kitt Peak || Spacewatch ||  || align=right | 1.6 km || 
|-id=194 bgcolor=#E9E9E9
| 525194 ||  || — || October 9, 2004 || Kitt Peak || Spacewatch ||  || align=right | 1.4 km || 
|-id=195 bgcolor=#d6d6d6
| 525195 ||  || — || October 9, 2004 || Kitt Peak || Spacewatch ||  || align=right | 4.0 km || 
|-id=196 bgcolor=#fefefe
| 525196 ||  || — || October 9, 2004 || Kitt Peak || Spacewatch ||  || align=right data-sort-value="0.67" | 670 m || 
|-id=197 bgcolor=#E9E9E9
| 525197 ||  || — || October 9, 2004 || Kitt Peak || Spacewatch ||  || align=right | 1.7 km || 
|-id=198 bgcolor=#E9E9E9
| 525198 ||  || — || October 8, 2004 || Kitt Peak || Spacewatch ||  || align=right | 1.5 km || 
|-id=199 bgcolor=#fefefe
| 525199 ||  || — || October 10, 2004 || Kitt Peak || Spacewatch ||  || align=right data-sort-value="0.61" | 610 m || 
|-id=200 bgcolor=#fefefe
| 525200 ||  || — || October 11, 2004 || Kitt Peak || Spacewatch ||  || align=right data-sort-value="0.61" | 610 m || 
|}

525201–525300 

|-bgcolor=#E9E9E9
| 525201 ||  || — || October 10, 2004 || Kitt Peak || Spacewatch ||  || align=right | 1.1 km || 
|-id=202 bgcolor=#E9E9E9
| 525202 ||  || — || October 11, 2004 || Kitt Peak || Spacewatch ||  || align=right | 1.3 km || 
|-id=203 bgcolor=#E9E9E9
| 525203 ||  || — || October 11, 2004 || Kitt Peak || Spacewatch ||  || align=right | 1.3 km || 
|-id=204 bgcolor=#E9E9E9
| 525204 ||  || — || October 11, 2004 || Kitt Peak || Spacewatch ||  || align=right | 1.6 km || 
|-id=205 bgcolor=#E9E9E9
| 525205 ||  || — || October 11, 2004 || Kitt Peak || Spacewatch ||  || align=right | 1.9 km || 
|-id=206 bgcolor=#fefefe
| 525206 ||  || — || October 12, 2004 || Anderson Mesa || LONEOS ||  || align=right data-sort-value="0.82" | 820 m || 
|-id=207 bgcolor=#E9E9E9
| 525207 ||  || — || September 24, 2004 || Kitt Peak || Spacewatch ||  || align=right | 1.5 km || 
|-id=208 bgcolor=#E9E9E9
| 525208 ||  || — || October 9, 2004 || Kitt Peak || Spacewatch ||  || align=right | 2.3 km || 
|-id=209 bgcolor=#d6d6d6
| 525209 ||  || — || October 9, 2004 || Kitt Peak || Spacewatch ||  || align=right | 2.4 km || 
|-id=210 bgcolor=#E9E9E9
| 525210 ||  || — || October 12, 2004 || Kitt Peak || Spacewatch ||  || align=right | 1.8 km || 
|-id=211 bgcolor=#d6d6d6
| 525211 ||  || — || October 12, 2004 || Kitt Peak || Spacewatch ||  || align=right | 2.1 km || 
|-id=212 bgcolor=#E9E9E9
| 525212 ||  || — || October 12, 2004 || Kitt Peak || Spacewatch ||  || align=right data-sort-value="0.68" | 680 m || 
|-id=213 bgcolor=#E9E9E9
| 525213 ||  || — || September 19, 1995 || Kitt Peak || Spacewatch ||  || align=right | 1.4 km || 
|-id=214 bgcolor=#fefefe
| 525214 ||  || — || October 5, 2004 || Kitt Peak || Spacewatch ||  || align=right | 1.1 km || 
|-id=215 bgcolor=#E9E9E9
| 525215 ||  || — || October 13, 2004 || Kitt Peak || Spacewatch ||  || align=right | 2.0 km || 
|-id=216 bgcolor=#fefefe
| 525216 ||  || — || October 13, 2004 || Kitt Peak || Spacewatch || H || align=right data-sort-value="0.57" | 570 m || 
|-id=217 bgcolor=#FA8072
| 525217 ||  || — || October 8, 2004 || Siding Spring || SSS ||  || align=right data-sort-value="0.82" | 820 m || 
|-id=218 bgcolor=#E9E9E9
| 525218 ||  || — || October 7, 2004 || Kitt Peak || Spacewatch ||  || align=right | 2.3 km || 
|-id=219 bgcolor=#E9E9E9
| 525219 ||  || — || October 10, 2004 || Kitt Peak || Spacewatch ||  || align=right data-sort-value="0.79" | 790 m || 
|-id=220 bgcolor=#E9E9E9
| 525220 ||  || — || August 23, 2004 || Siding Spring || SSS ||  || align=right | 1.6 km || 
|-id=221 bgcolor=#E9E9E9
| 525221 ||  || — || October 7, 2004 || Kitt Peak || Spacewatch ||  || align=right | 2.8 km || 
|-id=222 bgcolor=#E9E9E9
| 525222 ||  || — || October 13, 2004 || Kitt Peak || Spacewatch ||  || align=right | 1.3 km || 
|-id=223 bgcolor=#fefefe
| 525223 ||  || — || October 4, 2004 || Kitt Peak || Spacewatch ||  || align=right data-sort-value="0.71" | 710 m || 
|-id=224 bgcolor=#E9E9E9
| 525224 ||  || — || October 4, 2004 || Kitt Peak || Spacewatch ||  || align=right | 1.4 km || 
|-id=225 bgcolor=#E9E9E9
| 525225 ||  || — || October 10, 2004 || Kitt Peak || Spacewatch ||  || align=right | 1.2 km || 
|-id=226 bgcolor=#E9E9E9
| 525226 ||  || — || October 15, 2004 || Kitt Peak || Spacewatch ||  || align=right | 2.1 km || 
|-id=227 bgcolor=#fefefe
| 525227 ||  || — || October 15, 2004 || Mount Lemmon || Mount Lemmon Survey || H || align=right data-sort-value="0.50" | 500 m || 
|-id=228 bgcolor=#fefefe
| 525228 ||  || — || October 4, 2004 || Kitt Peak || Spacewatch ||  || align=right data-sort-value="0.59" | 590 m || 
|-id=229 bgcolor=#FFC2E0
| 525229 ||  || — || October 23, 2004 || Socorro || LINEAR || APOPHA || align=right data-sort-value="0.20" | 200 m || 
|-id=230 bgcolor=#E9E9E9
| 525230 ||  || — || October 21, 2004 || Socorro || LINEAR ||  || align=right | 2.6 km || 
|-id=231 bgcolor=#FFC2E0
| 525231 ||  || — || November 1, 2004 || Anderson Mesa || LONEOS || APOPHA || align=right data-sort-value="0.25" | 250 m || 
|-id=232 bgcolor=#fefefe
| 525232 ||  || — || October 8, 2004 || Anderson Mesa || LONEOS ||  || align=right | 2.8 km || 
|-id=233 bgcolor=#E9E9E9
| 525233 ||  || — || November 3, 2004 || Catalina || CSS ||  || align=right | 2.5 km || 
|-id=234 bgcolor=#FFC2E0
| 525234 ||  || — || November 7, 2004 || Socorro || LINEAR || AMO || align=right data-sort-value="0.41" | 410 m || 
|-id=235 bgcolor=#E9E9E9
| 525235 ||  || — || October 4, 2004 || Kitt Peak || Spacewatch ||  || align=right | 2.2 km || 
|-id=236 bgcolor=#fefefe
| 525236 ||  || — || October 10, 2004 || Kitt Peak || Spacewatch ||  || align=right data-sort-value="0.57" | 570 m || 
|-id=237 bgcolor=#fefefe
| 525237 ||  || — || October 23, 2004 || Kitt Peak || Spacewatch ||  || align=right data-sort-value="0.73" | 730 m || 
|-id=238 bgcolor=#d6d6d6
| 525238 ||  || — || October 10, 2004 || Kitt Peak || Spacewatch ||  || align=right | 2.5 km || 
|-id=239 bgcolor=#fefefe
| 525239 ||  || — || November 3, 2004 || Kitt Peak || Spacewatch ||  || align=right data-sort-value="0.67" | 670 m || 
|-id=240 bgcolor=#E9E9E9
| 525240 ||  || — || November 3, 2004 || Kitt Peak || Spacewatch ||  || align=right | 2.8 km || 
|-id=241 bgcolor=#d6d6d6
| 525241 ||  || — || November 3, 2004 || Kitt Peak || Spacewatch ||  || align=right | 2.7 km || 
|-id=242 bgcolor=#fefefe
| 525242 ||  || — || October 23, 2004 || Kitt Peak || Spacewatch ||  || align=right data-sort-value="0.59" | 590 m || 
|-id=243 bgcolor=#fefefe
| 525243 ||  || — || October 23, 2004 || Kitt Peak || Spacewatch ||  || align=right data-sort-value="0.49" | 490 m || 
|-id=244 bgcolor=#E9E9E9
| 525244 ||  || — || November 3, 2004 || Kitt Peak || Spacewatch ||  || align=right | 1.5 km || 
|-id=245 bgcolor=#E9E9E9
| 525245 ||  || — || November 4, 2004 || Kitt Peak || Spacewatch ||  || align=right | 1.7 km || 
|-id=246 bgcolor=#E9E9E9
| 525246 ||  || — || November 4, 2004 || Kitt Peak || Spacewatch ||  || align=right | 1.6 km || 
|-id=247 bgcolor=#E9E9E9
| 525247 ||  || — || November 4, 2004 || Kitt Peak || Spacewatch ||  || align=right | 1.9 km || 
|-id=248 bgcolor=#E9E9E9
| 525248 ||  || — || November 4, 2004 || Kitt Peak || Spacewatch ||  || align=right | 2.1 km || 
|-id=249 bgcolor=#E9E9E9
| 525249 ||  || — || November 4, 2004 || Kitt Peak || Spacewatch ||  || align=right | 1.5 km || 
|-id=250 bgcolor=#fefefe
| 525250 ||  || — || November 4, 2004 || Kitt Peak || Spacewatch ||  || align=right data-sort-value="0.65" | 650 m || 
|-id=251 bgcolor=#E9E9E9
| 525251 ||  || — || November 4, 2004 || Kitt Peak || Spacewatch ||  || align=right | 1.1 km || 
|-id=252 bgcolor=#fefefe
| 525252 ||  || — || November 4, 2004 || Kitt Peak || Spacewatch ||  || align=right data-sort-value="0.86" | 860 m || 
|-id=253 bgcolor=#fefefe
| 525253 ||  || — || November 4, 2004 || Kitt Peak || Spacewatch ||  || align=right data-sort-value="0.63" | 630 m || 
|-id=254 bgcolor=#E9E9E9
| 525254 ||  || — || November 4, 2004 || Kitt Peak || Spacewatch ||  || align=right | 1.5 km || 
|-id=255 bgcolor=#E9E9E9
| 525255 ||  || — || November 4, 2004 || Kitt Peak || Spacewatch ||  || align=right | 1.8 km || 
|-id=256 bgcolor=#d6d6d6
| 525256 ||  || — || November 10, 2004 || Kitt Peak || Spacewatch ||  || align=right | 2.6 km || 
|-id=257 bgcolor=#C2E0FF
| 525257 ||  || — || November 9, 2004 || Kitt Peak || M. W. Buie || res5:9 || align=right | 203 km || 
|-id=258 bgcolor=#C2E0FF
| 525258 ||  || — || November 9, 2004 || Kitt Peak || M. W. Buie || plutino || align=right | 233 km || 
|-id=259 bgcolor=#E9E9E9
| 525259 ||  || — || November 3, 2004 || Kitt Peak || Spacewatch ||  || align=right | 1.7 km || 
|-id=260 bgcolor=#E9E9E9
| 525260 ||  || — || November 3, 2004 || Kitt Peak || Spacewatch ||  || align=right | 2.0 km || 
|-id=261 bgcolor=#E9E9E9
| 525261 ||  || — || November 10, 2004 || Kitt Peak || Spacewatch ||  || align=right | 2.7 km || 
|-id=262 bgcolor=#E9E9E9
| 525262 ||  || — || November 9, 2004 || Catalina || CSS ||  || align=right | 2.2 km || 
|-id=263 bgcolor=#fefefe
| 525263 ||  || — || November 11, 2004 || Kitt Peak || Spacewatch || H || align=right data-sort-value="0.67" | 670 m || 
|-id=264 bgcolor=#E9E9E9
| 525264 ||  || — || November 4, 2004 || Kitt Peak || Spacewatch ||  || align=right | 2.8 km || 
|-id=265 bgcolor=#fefefe
| 525265 ||  || — || October 15, 2004 || Mount Lemmon || Mount Lemmon Survey ||  || align=right data-sort-value="0.62" | 620 m || 
|-id=266 bgcolor=#E9E9E9
| 525266 ||  || — || November 17, 2004 || Campo Imperatore || CINEOS ||  || align=right | 1.4 km || 
|-id=267 bgcolor=#fefefe
| 525267 ||  || — || December 9, 2004 || Kitt Peak || Spacewatch ||  || align=right data-sort-value="0.93" | 930 m || 
|-id=268 bgcolor=#FFC2E0
| 525268 ||  || — || December 10, 2004 || Catalina || CSS || ATEPHAcritical || align=right data-sort-value="0.20" | 200 m || 
|-id=269 bgcolor=#fefefe
| 525269 ||  || — || December 10, 2004 || Socorro || LINEAR ||  || align=right data-sort-value="0.94" | 940 m || 
|-id=270 bgcolor=#E9E9E9
| 525270 ||  || — || December 11, 2004 || Kitt Peak || Spacewatch ||  || align=right | 2.9 km || 
|-id=271 bgcolor=#d6d6d6
| 525271 ||  || — || December 7, 2004 || Socorro || LINEAR ||  || align=right | 4.8 km || 
|-id=272 bgcolor=#E9E9E9
| 525272 ||  || — || December 11, 2004 || Kitt Peak || Spacewatch ||  || align=right | 2.6 km || 
|-id=273 bgcolor=#fefefe
| 525273 ||  || — || December 11, 2004 || Campo Imperatore || CINEOS ||  || align=right data-sort-value="0.75" | 750 m || 
|-id=274 bgcolor=#fefefe
| 525274 ||  || — || December 10, 2004 || Kitt Peak || Spacewatch || H || align=right data-sort-value="0.72" | 720 m || 
|-id=275 bgcolor=#E9E9E9
| 525275 ||  || — || December 10, 2004 || Kitt Peak || Spacewatch ||  || align=right | 2.0 km || 
|-id=276 bgcolor=#fefefe
| 525276 ||  || — || December 10, 2004 || Kitt Peak || Spacewatch ||  || align=right data-sort-value="0.85" | 850 m || 
|-id=277 bgcolor=#fefefe
| 525277 ||  || — || December 10, 2004 || Kitt Peak || Spacewatch ||  || align=right data-sort-value="0.68" | 680 m || 
|-id=278 bgcolor=#E9E9E9
| 525278 ||  || — || December 2, 2004 || Kitt Peak || Spacewatch ||  || align=right | 2.0 km || 
|-id=279 bgcolor=#E9E9E9
| 525279 ||  || — || December 10, 2004 || Kitt Peak || Spacewatch ||  || align=right | 2.0 km || 
|-id=280 bgcolor=#E9E9E9
| 525280 ||  || — || December 9, 2004 || Kitt Peak || Spacewatch ||  || align=right | 3.1 km || 
|-id=281 bgcolor=#fefefe
| 525281 ||  || — || December 13, 2004 || Campo Imperatore || CINEOS ||  || align=right data-sort-value="0.89" | 890 m || 
|-id=282 bgcolor=#fefefe
| 525282 ||  || — || November 10, 2004 || Kitt Peak || Spacewatch ||  || align=right | 1.0 km || 
|-id=283 bgcolor=#fefefe
| 525283 ||  || — || November 19, 2004 || Socorro || LINEAR ||  || align=right | 1.1 km || 
|-id=284 bgcolor=#E9E9E9
| 525284 ||  || — || November 10, 2004 || Kitt Peak || Spacewatch ||  || align=right | 1.9 km || 
|-id=285 bgcolor=#E9E9E9
| 525285 ||  || — || December 10, 2004 || Socorro || LINEAR ||  || align=right | 1.8 km || 
|-id=286 bgcolor=#E9E9E9
| 525286 ||  || — || December 10, 2004 || Socorro || LINEAR ||  || align=right | 1.7 km || 
|-id=287 bgcolor=#E9E9E9
| 525287 ||  || — || December 10, 2004 || Socorro || LINEAR ||  || align=right | 2.2 km || 
|-id=288 bgcolor=#E9E9E9
| 525288 ||  || — || December 10, 2004 || Socorro || LINEAR ||  || align=right | 2.4 km || 
|-id=289 bgcolor=#E9E9E9
| 525289 ||  || — || November 11, 2004 || Kitt Peak || Spacewatch ||  || align=right | 3.7 km || 
|-id=290 bgcolor=#fefefe
| 525290 ||  || — || November 20, 2004 || Kitt Peak || Spacewatch ||  || align=right data-sort-value="0.50" | 500 m || 
|-id=291 bgcolor=#fefefe
| 525291 ||  || — || December 11, 2004 || Kitt Peak || Spacewatch ||  || align=right data-sort-value="0.56" | 560 m || 
|-id=292 bgcolor=#E9E9E9
| 525292 ||  || — || December 11, 2004 || Kitt Peak || Spacewatch ||  || align=right | 2.1 km || 
|-id=293 bgcolor=#E9E9E9
| 525293 ||  || — || December 11, 2004 || Kitt Peak || Spacewatch ||  || align=right | 1.3 km || 
|-id=294 bgcolor=#E9E9E9
| 525294 ||  || — || December 11, 2004 || Kitt Peak || Spacewatch ||  || align=right | 2.6 km || 
|-id=295 bgcolor=#E9E9E9
| 525295 ||  || — || December 11, 2004 || Kitt Peak || Spacewatch ||  || align=right | 2.4 km || 
|-id=296 bgcolor=#d6d6d6
| 525296 ||  || — || December 10, 2004 || Socorro || LINEAR ||  || align=right | 2.6 km || 
|-id=297 bgcolor=#E9E9E9
| 525297 ||  || — || December 11, 2004 || Kitt Peak || Spacewatch ||  || align=right | 1.6 km || 
|-id=298 bgcolor=#fefefe
| 525298 ||  || — || December 12, 2004 || Kitt Peak || Spacewatch ||  || align=right data-sort-value="0.67" | 670 m || 
|-id=299 bgcolor=#E9E9E9
| 525299 ||  || — || December 15, 2004 || Socorro || LINEAR ||  || align=right | 2.1 km || 
|-id=300 bgcolor=#E9E9E9
| 525300 ||  || — || December 13, 2004 || Kitt Peak || Spacewatch ||  || align=right | 2.0 km || 
|}

525301–525400 

|-bgcolor=#fefefe
| 525301 ||  || — || December 7, 2004 || Socorro || LINEAR ||  || align=right | 2.1 km || 
|-id=302 bgcolor=#E9E9E9
| 525302 ||  || — || December 15, 2004 || Kitt Peak || Spacewatch ||  || align=right | 2.0 km || 
|-id=303 bgcolor=#fefefe
| 525303 ||  || — || November 20, 2004 || Kitt Peak || Spacewatch ||  || align=right data-sort-value="0.67" | 670 m || 
|-id=304 bgcolor=#fefefe
| 525304 ||  || — || November 20, 2004 || Kitt Peak || Spacewatch ||  || align=right data-sort-value="0.65" | 650 m || 
|-id=305 bgcolor=#E9E9E9
| 525305 ||  || — || December 3, 2004 || Kitt Peak || Spacewatch ||  || align=right | 2.0 km || 
|-id=306 bgcolor=#E9E9E9
| 525306 ||  || — || December 15, 2004 || Kitt Peak || Spacewatch ||  || align=right | 2.5 km || 
|-id=307 bgcolor=#E9E9E9
| 525307 ||  || — || December 14, 2004 || Kitt Peak || Spacewatch ||  || align=right | 2.5 km || 
|-id=308 bgcolor=#fefefe
| 525308 ||  || — || December 15, 2004 || Kitt Peak || Spacewatch ||  || align=right data-sort-value="0.73" | 730 m || 
|-id=309 bgcolor=#d6d6d6
| 525309 ||  || — || December 9, 2004 || Kitt Peak || Spacewatch ||  || align=right | 2.6 km || 
|-id=310 bgcolor=#d6d6d6
| 525310 ||  || — || December 10, 2004 || Kitt Peak || Spacewatch ||  || align=right | 3.4 km || 
|-id=311 bgcolor=#d6d6d6
| 525311 ||  || — || December 11, 2004 || Kitt Peak || Spacewatch ||  || align=right | 3.5 km || 
|-id=312 bgcolor=#E9E9E9
| 525312 ||  || — || December 11, 2004 || Kitt Peak || Spacewatch ||  || align=right | 2.0 km || 
|-id=313 bgcolor=#d6d6d6
| 525313 ||  || — || December 11, 2004 || Kitt Peak || Spacewatch ||  || align=right | 2.6 km || 
|-id=314 bgcolor=#fefefe
| 525314 ||  || — || December 11, 2004 || Campo Imperatore || CINEOS ||  || align=right data-sort-value="0.92" | 920 m || 
|-id=315 bgcolor=#E9E9E9
| 525315 ||  || — || December 13, 2004 || Campo Imperatore || CINEOS ||  || align=right | 2.9 km || 
|-id=316 bgcolor=#fefefe
| 525316 ||  || — || December 15, 2004 || Socorro || LINEAR || H || align=right data-sort-value="0.70" | 700 m || 
|-id=317 bgcolor=#fefefe
| 525317 ||  || — || March 28, 1995 || Kitt Peak || Spacewatch ||  || align=right data-sort-value="0.85" | 850 m || 
|-id=318 bgcolor=#E9E9E9
| 525318 ||  || — || December 15, 2004 || Kitt Peak || Spacewatch ||  || align=right | 2.3 km || 
|-id=319 bgcolor=#FFC2E0
| 525319 ||  || — || December 20, 2004 || Socorro || LINEAR || AMOcritical || align=right data-sort-value="0.56" | 560 m || 
|-id=320 bgcolor=#fefefe
| 525320 ||  || — || December 18, 2004 || Mount Lemmon || Mount Lemmon Survey ||  || align=right data-sort-value="0.62" | 620 m || 
|-id=321 bgcolor=#E9E9E9
| 525321 ||  || — || December 18, 2004 || Mount Lemmon || Mount Lemmon Survey ||  || align=right | 1.9 km || 
|-id=322 bgcolor=#E9E9E9
| 525322 ||  || — || December 18, 2004 || Mount Lemmon || Mount Lemmon Survey ||  || align=right | 1.7 km || 
|-id=323 bgcolor=#E9E9E9
| 525323 ||  || — || December 18, 2004 || Mount Lemmon || Mount Lemmon Survey ||  || align=right | 1.9 km || 
|-id=324 bgcolor=#E9E9E9
| 525324 ||  || — || December 18, 2004 || Mount Lemmon || Mount Lemmon Survey ||  || align=right | 1.7 km || 
|-id=325 bgcolor=#fefefe
| 525325 ||  || — || December 18, 2004 || Mount Lemmon || Mount Lemmon Survey ||  || align=right | 1.2 km || 
|-id=326 bgcolor=#fefefe
| 525326 ||  || — || December 18, 2004 || Mount Lemmon || Mount Lemmon Survey ||  || align=right data-sort-value="0.79" | 790 m || 
|-id=327 bgcolor=#fefefe
| 525327 ||  || — || December 16, 2004 || Kitt Peak || Spacewatch ||  || align=right data-sort-value="0.70" | 700 m || 
|-id=328 bgcolor=#E9E9E9
| 525328 ||  || — || December 18, 2004 || Mount Lemmon || Mount Lemmon Survey ||  || align=right | 1.8 km || 
|-id=329 bgcolor=#E9E9E9
| 525329 ||  || — || December 16, 2004 || Socorro || LINEAR ||  || align=right | 3.5 km || 
|-id=330 bgcolor=#d6d6d6
| 525330 ||  || — || September 6, 2008 || Mount Lemmon || Mount Lemmon Survey ||  || align=right | 2.3 km || 
|-id=331 bgcolor=#fefefe
| 525331 ||  || — || December 19, 2004 || Mount Lemmon || Mount Lemmon Survey ||  || align=right data-sort-value="0.71" | 710 m || 
|-id=332 bgcolor=#fefefe
| 525332 ||  || — || December 20, 2004 || Mount Lemmon || Mount Lemmon Survey ||  || align=right data-sort-value="0.79" | 790 m || 
|-id=333 bgcolor=#fefefe
| 525333 ||  || — || December 20, 2004 || Mount Lemmon || Mount Lemmon Survey ||  || align=right data-sort-value="0.77" | 770 m || 
|-id=334 bgcolor=#fefefe
| 525334 ||  || — || January 6, 2005 || Catalina || CSS ||  || align=right | 1.1 km || 
|-id=335 bgcolor=#E9E9E9
| 525335 ||  || — || January 7, 2005 || Socorro || LINEAR ||  || align=right | 3.6 km || 
|-id=336 bgcolor=#E9E9E9
| 525336 ||  || — || December 14, 2004 || Campo Imperatore || CINEOS ||  || align=right | 2.0 km || 
|-id=337 bgcolor=#fefefe
| 525337 ||  || — || December 19, 2004 || Mount Lemmon || Mount Lemmon Survey ||  || align=right data-sort-value="0.75" | 750 m || 
|-id=338 bgcolor=#FA8072
| 525338 ||  || — || January 15, 2005 || Catalina || CSS ||  || align=right data-sort-value="0.90" | 900 m || 
|-id=339 bgcolor=#d6d6d6
| 525339 ||  || — || January 13, 2005 || Kitt Peak || Spacewatch ||  || align=right | 3.2 km || 
|-id=340 bgcolor=#E9E9E9
| 525340 ||  || — || January 13, 2005 || Kitt Peak || Spacewatch ||  || align=right | 2.1 km || 
|-id=341 bgcolor=#E9E9E9
| 525341 ||  || — || January 13, 2005 || Kitt Peak || Spacewatch ||  || align=right | 2.0 km || 
|-id=342 bgcolor=#E9E9E9
| 525342 ||  || — || January 13, 2005 || Kitt Peak || Spacewatch ||  || align=right | 2.5 km || 
|-id=343 bgcolor=#fefefe
| 525343 ||  || — || January 13, 2005 || Kitt Peak || Spacewatch ||  || align=right data-sort-value="0.73" | 730 m || 
|-id=344 bgcolor=#E9E9E9
| 525344 ||  || — || January 13, 2005 || Kitt Peak || Spacewatch ||  || align=right | 1.5 km || 
|-id=345 bgcolor=#fefefe
| 525345 ||  || — || January 13, 2005 || Kitt Peak || Spacewatch ||  || align=right data-sort-value="0.66" | 660 m || 
|-id=346 bgcolor=#E9E9E9
| 525346 ||  || — || January 13, 2005 || Kitt Peak || Spacewatch ||  || align=right | 1.5 km || 
|-id=347 bgcolor=#fefefe
| 525347 ||  || — || January 15, 2005 || Kitt Peak || Spacewatch ||  || align=right data-sort-value="0.76" | 760 m || 
|-id=348 bgcolor=#E9E9E9
| 525348 ||  || — || January 15, 2005 || Kitt Peak || Spacewatch ||  || align=right | 1.9 km || 
|-id=349 bgcolor=#fefefe
| 525349 ||  || — || January 15, 2005 || Kitt Peak || Spacewatch ||  || align=right data-sort-value="0.58" | 580 m || 
|-id=350 bgcolor=#fefefe
| 525350 ||  || — || January 15, 2005 || Kitt Peak || Spacewatch ||  || align=right data-sort-value="0.80" | 800 m || 
|-id=351 bgcolor=#E9E9E9
| 525351 ||  || — || January 15, 2005 || Kitt Peak || Spacewatch ||  || align=right | 2.1 km || 
|-id=352 bgcolor=#E9E9E9
| 525352 ||  || — || January 15, 2005 || Kitt Peak || Spacewatch ||  || align=right | 2.2 km || 
|-id=353 bgcolor=#E9E9E9
| 525353 ||  || — || January 15, 2005 || Kitt Peak || Spacewatch ||  || align=right | 1.7 km || 
|-id=354 bgcolor=#fefefe
| 525354 ||  || — || January 15, 2005 || Kitt Peak || Spacewatch ||  || align=right data-sort-value="0.67" | 670 m || 
|-id=355 bgcolor=#E9E9E9
| 525355 ||  || — || January 8, 2005 || Campo Imperatore || CINEOS ||  || align=right | 2.0 km || 
|-id=356 bgcolor=#FFC2E0
| 525356 ||  || — || January 20, 2005 || Anderson Mesa || LONEOS || APOPHA || align=right data-sort-value="0.66" | 660 m || 
|-id=357 bgcolor=#fefefe
| 525357 ||  || — || January 16, 2005 || Kitt Peak || Spacewatch ||  || align=right data-sort-value="0.64" | 640 m || 
|-id=358 bgcolor=#fefefe
| 525358 ||  || — || January 16, 2005 || Kitt Peak || Spacewatch ||  || align=right data-sort-value="0.79" | 790 m || 
|-id=359 bgcolor=#fefefe
| 525359 ||  || — || January 16, 2005 || Catalina || CSS ||  || align=right data-sort-value="0.87" | 870 m || 
|-id=360 bgcolor=#fefefe
| 525360 ||  || — || January 13, 2005 || Kitt Peak || Spacewatch || H || align=right data-sort-value="0.93" | 930 m || 
|-id=361 bgcolor=#d6d6d6
| 525361 ||  || — || January 13, 2005 || Kitt Peak || Spacewatch ||  || align=right | 3.2 km || 
|-id=362 bgcolor=#E9E9E9
| 525362 ||  || — || January 13, 2005 || Kitt Peak || Spacewatch ||  || align=right | 1.6 km || 
|-id=363 bgcolor=#fefefe
| 525363 ||  || — || January 17, 2005 || Catalina || CSS || H || align=right data-sort-value="0.73" | 730 m || 
|-id=364 bgcolor=#FFC2E0
| 525364 ||  || — || February 3, 2005 || Socorro || LINEAR || APOcritical || align=right data-sort-value="0.42" | 420 m || 
|-id=365 bgcolor=#fefefe
| 525365 ||  || — || January 15, 2005 || Kitt Peak || Spacewatch ||  || align=right data-sort-value="0.73" | 730 m || 
|-id=366 bgcolor=#fefefe
| 525366 ||  || — || February 1, 2005 || Kitt Peak || Spacewatch ||  || align=right data-sort-value="0.86" | 860 m || 
|-id=367 bgcolor=#E9E9E9
| 525367 ||  || — || February 1, 2005 || Kitt Peak || Spacewatch ||  || align=right | 2.0 km || 
|-id=368 bgcolor=#fefefe
| 525368 ||  || — || February 1, 2005 || Kitt Peak || Spacewatch ||  || align=right data-sort-value="0.66" | 660 m || 
|-id=369 bgcolor=#fefefe
| 525369 ||  || — || February 1, 2005 || Kitt Peak || Spacewatch ||  || align=right data-sort-value="0.85" | 850 m || 
|-id=370 bgcolor=#fefefe
| 525370 ||  || — || December 18, 2004 || Mount Lemmon || Mount Lemmon Survey ||  || align=right data-sort-value="0.77" | 770 m || 
|-id=371 bgcolor=#E9E9E9
| 525371 ||  || — || February 2, 2005 || Kitt Peak || Spacewatch ||  || align=right | 2.0 km || 
|-id=372 bgcolor=#fefefe
| 525372 ||  || — || February 2, 2005 || Kitt Peak || Spacewatch ||  || align=right data-sort-value="0.74" | 740 m || 
|-id=373 bgcolor=#fefefe
| 525373 ||  || — || February 4, 2005 || Mount Lemmon || Mount Lemmon Survey ||  || align=right data-sort-value="0.64" | 640 m || 
|-id=374 bgcolor=#fefefe
| 525374 ||  || — || February 1, 2005 || Kitt Peak || Spacewatch ||  || align=right data-sort-value="0.49" | 490 m || 
|-id=375 bgcolor=#E9E9E9
| 525375 ||  || — || May 21, 2015 || Haleakala || Pan-STARRS ||  || align=right | 1.5 km || 
|-id=376 bgcolor=#E9E9E9
| 525376 ||  || — || February 4, 2005 || Mount Lemmon || Mount Lemmon Survey ||  || align=right | 1.9 km || 
|-id=377 bgcolor=#fefefe
| 525377 ||  || — || February 9, 2005 || Anderson Mesa || LONEOS ||  || align=right data-sort-value="0.67" | 670 m || 
|-id=378 bgcolor=#fefefe
| 525378 ||  || — || March 2, 2005 || Kitt Peak || Spacewatch ||  || align=right data-sort-value="0.92" | 920 m || 
|-id=379 bgcolor=#fefefe
| 525379 ||  || — || March 3, 2005 || Kitt Peak || Spacewatch ||  || align=right data-sort-value="0.75" | 750 m || 
|-id=380 bgcolor=#E9E9E9
| 525380 ||  || — || March 3, 2005 || Kitt Peak || Spacewatch ||  || align=right | 1.7 km || 
|-id=381 bgcolor=#fefefe
| 525381 ||  || — || March 3, 2005 || Catalina || CSS ||  || align=right data-sort-value="0.80" | 800 m || 
|-id=382 bgcolor=#fefefe
| 525382 ||  || — || March 3, 2005 || Catalina || CSS ||  || align=right data-sort-value="0.99" | 990 m || 
|-id=383 bgcolor=#fefefe
| 525383 ||  || — || February 2, 2005 || Kitt Peak || Spacewatch ||  || align=right data-sort-value="0.59" | 590 m || 
|-id=384 bgcolor=#E9E9E9
| 525384 ||  || — || March 2, 2005 || Kitt Peak || Spacewatch ||  || align=right | 2.1 km || 
|-id=385 bgcolor=#fefefe
| 525385 ||  || — || March 3, 2005 || Kitt Peak || Spacewatch ||  || align=right data-sort-value="0.62" | 620 m || 
|-id=386 bgcolor=#fefefe
| 525386 ||  || — || March 4, 2005 || Mount Lemmon || Mount Lemmon Survey ||  || align=right data-sort-value="0.76" | 760 m || 
|-id=387 bgcolor=#E9E9E9
| 525387 ||  || — || September 28, 2003 || Kitt Peak || Spacewatch ||  || align=right | 1.7 km || 
|-id=388 bgcolor=#d6d6d6
| 525388 ||  || — || February 9, 2005 || Kitt Peak || Spacewatch ||  || align=right | 3.2 km || 
|-id=389 bgcolor=#E9E9E9
| 525389 ||  || — || March 4, 2005 || Mount Lemmon || Mount Lemmon Survey ||  || align=right | 2.1 km || 
|-id=390 bgcolor=#E9E9E9
| 525390 ||  || — || January 1, 2014 || Kitt Peak || Spacewatch ||  || align=right | 1.8 km || 
|-id=391 bgcolor=#fefefe
| 525391 ||  || — || March 4, 2005 || Mount Lemmon || Mount Lemmon Survey ||  || align=right data-sort-value="0.74" | 740 m || 
|-id=392 bgcolor=#fefefe
| 525392 ||  || — || March 3, 2005 || Kitt Peak || Spacewatch ||  || align=right data-sort-value="0.48" | 480 m || 
|-id=393 bgcolor=#fefefe
| 525393 ||  || — || March 3, 2005 || Kitt Peak || Spacewatch ||  || align=right data-sort-value="0.47" | 470 m || 
|-id=394 bgcolor=#fefefe
| 525394 ||  || — || March 3, 2005 || Catalina || CSS ||  || align=right data-sort-value="0.87" | 870 m || 
|-id=395 bgcolor=#FA8072
| 525395 ||  || — || March 3, 2005 || Catalina || CSS ||  || align=right data-sort-value="0.61" | 610 m || 
|-id=396 bgcolor=#d6d6d6
| 525396 ||  || — || March 4, 2005 || Mount Lemmon || Mount Lemmon Survey ||  || align=right | 2.2 km || 
|-id=397 bgcolor=#E9E9E9
| 525397 ||  || — || March 4, 2005 || Mount Lemmon || Mount Lemmon Survey ||  || align=right | 1.8 km || 
|-id=398 bgcolor=#fefefe
| 525398 ||  || — || March 4, 2005 || Mount Lemmon || Mount Lemmon Survey ||  || align=right data-sort-value="0.62" | 620 m || 
|-id=399 bgcolor=#FA8072
| 525399 ||  || — || March 4, 2005 || Mount Lemmon || Mount Lemmon Survey ||  || align=right data-sort-value="0.90" | 900 m || 
|-id=400 bgcolor=#fefefe
| 525400 ||  || — || December 20, 2004 || Mount Lemmon || Mount Lemmon Survey ||  || align=right data-sort-value="0.68" | 680 m || 
|}

525401–525500 

|-bgcolor=#E9E9E9
| 525401 ||  || — || November 6, 1999 || Socorro || LINEAR ||  || align=right | 2.5 km || 
|-id=402 bgcolor=#fefefe
| 525402 ||  || — || March 4, 2005 || Mount Lemmon || Mount Lemmon Survey ||  || align=right data-sort-value="0.76" | 760 m || 
|-id=403 bgcolor=#E9E9E9
| 525403 ||  || — || March 12, 2010 || Mount Lemmon || Mount Lemmon Survey ||  || align=right | 2.4 km || 
|-id=404 bgcolor=#fefefe
| 525404 ||  || — || February 9, 2005 || Mount Lemmon || Mount Lemmon Survey ||  || align=right data-sort-value="0.96" | 960 m || 
|-id=405 bgcolor=#E9E9E9
| 525405 ||  || — || March 4, 2005 || Mount Lemmon || Mount Lemmon Survey ||  || align=right | 2.3 km || 
|-id=406 bgcolor=#fefefe
| 525406 ||  || — || March 4, 2005 || Mount Lemmon || Mount Lemmon Survey ||  || align=right data-sort-value="0.58" | 580 m || 
|-id=407 bgcolor=#fefefe
| 525407 ||  || — || March 8, 2005 || Anderson Mesa || LONEOS ||  || align=right data-sort-value="0.89" | 890 m || 
|-id=408 bgcolor=#E9E9E9
| 525408 ||  || — || March 8, 2005 || Mount Lemmon || Mount Lemmon Survey ||  || align=right | 1.3 km || 
|-id=409 bgcolor=#fefefe
| 525409 ||  || — || March 8, 2005 || Kitt Peak || Spacewatch ||  || align=right data-sort-value="0.75" | 750 m || 
|-id=410 bgcolor=#d6d6d6
| 525410 ||  || — || March 8, 2005 || Kitt Peak || Spacewatch ||  || align=right | 3.3 km || 
|-id=411 bgcolor=#fefefe
| 525411 ||  || — || September 18, 2003 || Kitt Peak || Spacewatch ||  || align=right data-sort-value="0.69" | 690 m || 
|-id=412 bgcolor=#E9E9E9
| 525412 ||  || — || March 9, 2005 || Kitt Peak || Spacewatch ||  || align=right | 2.3 km || 
|-id=413 bgcolor=#fefefe
| 525413 ||  || — || March 9, 2005 || Mount Lemmon || Mount Lemmon Survey ||  || align=right data-sort-value="0.59" | 590 m || 
|-id=414 bgcolor=#E9E9E9
| 525414 ||  || — || March 3, 2005 || Kitt Peak || Spacewatch ||  || align=right | 1.9 km || 
|-id=415 bgcolor=#fefefe
| 525415 ||  || — || March 10, 2005 || Mount Lemmon || Mount Lemmon Survey ||  || align=right data-sort-value="0.90" | 900 m || 
|-id=416 bgcolor=#fefefe
| 525416 ||  || — || March 10, 2005 || Mount Lemmon || Mount Lemmon Survey ||  || align=right data-sort-value="0.58" | 580 m || 
|-id=417 bgcolor=#fefefe
| 525417 ||  || — || March 10, 2005 || Kitt Peak || Spacewatch ||  || align=right data-sort-value="0.65" | 650 m || 
|-id=418 bgcolor=#fefefe
| 525418 ||  || — || March 9, 2005 || Mount Lemmon || Mount Lemmon Survey ||  || align=right data-sort-value="0.60" | 600 m || 
|-id=419 bgcolor=#fefefe
| 525419 ||  || — || March 4, 2005 || Mount Lemmon || Mount Lemmon Survey ||  || align=right data-sort-value="0.58" | 580 m || 
|-id=420 bgcolor=#fefefe
| 525420 ||  || — || March 11, 2005 || Mount Lemmon || Mount Lemmon Survey ||  || align=right data-sort-value="0.71" | 710 m || 
|-id=421 bgcolor=#FA8072
| 525421 ||  || — || March 8, 2005 || Kitt Peak || Spacewatch ||  || align=right data-sort-value="0.41" | 410 m || 
|-id=422 bgcolor=#FA8072
| 525422 ||  || — || March 12, 2005 || Socorro || LINEAR ||  || align=right | 1.2 km || 
|-id=423 bgcolor=#fefefe
| 525423 ||  || — || March 8, 2005 || Kitt Peak || Spacewatch ||  || align=right data-sort-value="0.66" | 660 m || 
|-id=424 bgcolor=#fefefe
| 525424 ||  || — || March 9, 2005 || Kitt Peak || Spacewatch ||  || align=right data-sort-value="0.68" | 680 m || 
|-id=425 bgcolor=#fefefe
| 525425 ||  || — || March 10, 2005 || Mount Lemmon || Mount Lemmon Survey ||  || align=right data-sort-value="0.59" | 590 m || 
|-id=426 bgcolor=#E9E9E9
| 525426 ||  || — || March 11, 2005 || Mount Lemmon || Mount Lemmon Survey ||  || align=right | 1.8 km || 
|-id=427 bgcolor=#fefefe
| 525427 ||  || — || March 11, 2005 || Mount Lemmon || Mount Lemmon Survey ||  || align=right data-sort-value="0.62" | 620 m || 
|-id=428 bgcolor=#E9E9E9
| 525428 ||  || — || March 11, 2005 || Mount Lemmon || Mount Lemmon Survey ||  || align=right | 2.1 km || 
|-id=429 bgcolor=#E9E9E9
| 525429 ||  || — || March 11, 2005 || Mount Lemmon || Mount Lemmon Survey ||  || align=right | 1.9 km || 
|-id=430 bgcolor=#d6d6d6
| 525430 ||  || — || March 4, 2005 || Kitt Peak || Spacewatch ||  || align=right | 2.9 km || 
|-id=431 bgcolor=#fefefe
| 525431 ||  || — || March 4, 2005 || Kitt Peak || Spacewatch ||  || align=right data-sort-value="0.67" | 670 m || 
|-id=432 bgcolor=#fefefe
| 525432 ||  || — || March 3, 2005 || Catalina || CSS ||  || align=right data-sort-value="0.71" | 710 m || 
|-id=433 bgcolor=#fefefe
| 525433 ||  || — || March 8, 2005 || Kitt Peak || Spacewatch ||  || align=right data-sort-value="0.63" | 630 m || 
|-id=434 bgcolor=#d6d6d6
| 525434 ||  || — || March 8, 2005 || Anderson Mesa || LONEOS ||  || align=right | 3.9 km || 
|-id=435 bgcolor=#E9E9E9
| 525435 ||  || — || March 8, 2005 || Mount Lemmon || Mount Lemmon Survey ||  || align=right | 1.9 km || 
|-id=436 bgcolor=#d6d6d6
| 525436 ||  || — || February 4, 2005 || Kitt Peak || Spacewatch ||  || align=right | 3.2 km || 
|-id=437 bgcolor=#E9E9E9
| 525437 ||  || — || March 10, 2005 || Mount Lemmon || Mount Lemmon Survey ||  || align=right | 1.7 km || 
|-id=438 bgcolor=#E9E9E9
| 525438 ||  || — || March 10, 2005 || Mount Lemmon || Mount Lemmon Survey ||  || align=right | 2.0 km || 
|-id=439 bgcolor=#d6d6d6
| 525439 ||  || — || March 26, 1995 || Kitt Peak || Spacewatch ||  || align=right | 4.5 km || 
|-id=440 bgcolor=#fefefe
| 525440 ||  || — || March 11, 2005 || Kitt Peak || Spacewatch ||  || align=right data-sort-value="0.85" | 850 m || 
|-id=441 bgcolor=#fefefe
| 525441 ||  || — || March 11, 2005 || Kitt Peak || Spacewatch ||  || align=right data-sort-value="0.66" | 660 m || 
|-id=442 bgcolor=#fefefe
| 525442 ||  || — || March 11, 2005 || Catalina || CSS ||  || align=right data-sort-value="0.90" | 900 m || 
|-id=443 bgcolor=#d6d6d6
| 525443 ||  || — || March 12, 2005 || Kitt Peak || Spacewatch ||  || align=right | 2.3 km || 
|-id=444 bgcolor=#fefefe
| 525444 ||  || — || March 11, 2005 || Kitt Peak || Spacewatch ||  || align=right data-sort-value="0.94" | 940 m || 
|-id=445 bgcolor=#E9E9E9
| 525445 ||  || — || February 1, 2005 || Kitt Peak || Spacewatch ||  || align=right | 2.0 km || 
|-id=446 bgcolor=#E9E9E9
| 525446 ||  || — || March 11, 2005 || Mount Lemmon || Mount Lemmon Survey ||  || align=right | 2.1 km || 
|-id=447 bgcolor=#E9E9E9
| 525447 ||  || — || March 11, 2005 || Mount Lemmon || Mount Lemmon Survey ||  || align=right | 1.4 km || 
|-id=448 bgcolor=#fefefe
| 525448 ||  || — || March 11, 2005 || Mount Lemmon || Mount Lemmon Survey ||  || align=right data-sort-value="0.54" | 540 m || 
|-id=449 bgcolor=#E9E9E9
| 525449 ||  || — || March 13, 2005 || Kitt Peak || Spacewatch ||  || align=right | 2.3 km || 
|-id=450 bgcolor=#E9E9E9
| 525450 ||  || — || March 13, 2005 || Mount Lemmon || Mount Lemmon Survey ||  || align=right | 2.9 km || 
|-id=451 bgcolor=#fefefe
| 525451 ||  || — || March 13, 2005 || Kitt Peak || Spacewatch ||  || align=right data-sort-value="0.79" | 790 m || 
|-id=452 bgcolor=#d6d6d6
| 525452 ||  || — || March 13, 2005 || Kitt Peak || Spacewatch ||  || align=right | 2.7 km || 
|-id=453 bgcolor=#fefefe
| 525453 ||  || — || March 13, 2005 || Kitt Peak || Spacewatch ||  || align=right data-sort-value="0.84" | 840 m || 
|-id=454 bgcolor=#d6d6d6
| 525454 ||  || — || March 8, 2005 || Mount Lemmon || Mount Lemmon Survey ||  || align=right | 2.9 km || 
|-id=455 bgcolor=#d6d6d6
| 525455 ||  || — || March 11, 2005 || Mount Lemmon || Mount Lemmon Survey ||  || align=right | 2.7 km || 
|-id=456 bgcolor=#d6d6d6
| 525456 ||  || — || March 11, 2005 || Mount Lemmon || Mount Lemmon Survey ||  || align=right | 2.7 km || 
|-id=457 bgcolor=#E9E9E9
| 525457 ||  || — || March 9, 2005 || Catalina || CSS ||  || align=right | 2.5 km || 
|-id=458 bgcolor=#E9E9E9
| 525458 ||  || — || March 9, 2005 || Catalina || CSS ||  || align=right | 2.4 km || 
|-id=459 bgcolor=#fefefe
| 525459 ||  || — || March 11, 2005 || Kitt Peak || M. W. Buie ||  || align=right data-sort-value="0.48" | 480 m || 
|-id=460 bgcolor=#C2E0FF
| 525460 ||  || — || March 11, 2005 || Kitt Peak || M. W. Buie || cubewano (cold)critical || align=right | 222 km || 
|-id=461 bgcolor=#C2E0FF
| 525461 ||  || — || March 11, 2005 || Kitt Peak || M. W. Buie || cubewano (cold) || align=right | 185 km || 
|-id=462 bgcolor=#C2E0FF
| 525462 ||  || — || March 11, 2005 || Kitt Peak || M. W. Buie || cubewano (cold)moon || align=right | 254 km || 
|-id=463 bgcolor=#E9E9E9
| 525463 ||  || — || February 9, 2005 || Kitt Peak || Spacewatch ||  || align=right | 1.8 km || 
|-id=464 bgcolor=#fefefe
| 525464 ||  || — || March 4, 2005 || Mount Lemmon || Mount Lemmon Survey ||  || align=right data-sort-value="0.90" | 900 m || 
|-id=465 bgcolor=#fefefe
| 525465 ||  || — || January 27, 2012 || Mount Lemmon || Mount Lemmon Survey ||  || align=right data-sort-value="0.67" | 670 m || 
|-id=466 bgcolor=#E9E9E9
| 525466 ||  || — || December 1, 2008 || Kitt Peak || Spacewatch ||  || align=right | 1.3 km || 
|-id=467 bgcolor=#d6d6d6
| 525467 ||  || — || March 9, 2005 || Catalina || CSS ||  || align=right | 3.2 km || 
|-id=468 bgcolor=#d6d6d6
| 525468 ||  || — || February 17, 2010 || Kitt Peak || Spacewatch ||  || align=right | 2.2 km || 
|-id=469 bgcolor=#E9E9E9
| 525469 ||  || — || March 10, 2005 || Mount Lemmon || Mount Lemmon Survey ||  || align=right | 1.5 km || 
|-id=470 bgcolor=#fefefe
| 525470 ||  || — || March 4, 2005 || Mount Lemmon || Mount Lemmon Survey ||  || align=right data-sort-value="0.74" | 740 m || 
|-id=471 bgcolor=#d6d6d6
| 525471 ||  || — || March 4, 2005 || Mount Lemmon || Mount Lemmon Survey ||  || align=right | 2.4 km || 
|-id=472 bgcolor=#E9E9E9
| 525472 ||  || — || March 4, 2005 || Mount Lemmon || Mount Lemmon Survey ||  || align=right | 2.0 km || 
|-id=473 bgcolor=#fefefe
| 525473 ||  || — || March 8, 2005 || Mount Lemmon || Mount Lemmon Survey ||  || align=right data-sort-value="0.78" | 780 m || 
|-id=474 bgcolor=#E9E9E9
| 525474 ||  || — || March 10, 2005 || Mount Lemmon || Mount Lemmon Survey ||  || align=right | 2.1 km || 
|-id=475 bgcolor=#fefefe
| 525475 ||  || — || March 10, 2005 || Mount Lemmon || Mount Lemmon Survey ||  || align=right data-sort-value="0.77" | 770 m || 
|-id=476 bgcolor=#E9E9E9
| 525476 ||  || — || March 13, 2005 || Catalina || CSS ||  || align=right | 2.2 km || 
|-id=477 bgcolor=#FFC2E0
| 525477 ||  || — || March 17, 2005 || Mount Lemmon || Mount Lemmon Survey || APO || align=right data-sort-value="0.49" | 490 m || 
|-id=478 bgcolor=#fefefe
| 525478 ||  || — || March 16, 2005 || Catalina || CSS ||  || align=right data-sort-value="0.82" | 820 m || 
|-id=479 bgcolor=#d6d6d6
| 525479 ||  || — || March 17, 2005 || Kitt Peak || Spacewatch ||  || align=right | 2.9 km || 
|-id=480 bgcolor=#fefefe
| 525480 ||  || — || March 17, 2005 || Kitt Peak || Spacewatch ||  || align=right data-sort-value="0.83" | 830 m || 
|-id=481 bgcolor=#fefefe
| 525481 ||  || — || March 16, 2005 || Kitt Peak || Spacewatch ||  || align=right data-sort-value="0.65" | 650 m || 
|-id=482 bgcolor=#fefefe
| 525482 ||  || — || March 16, 2005 || Mount Lemmon || Mount Lemmon Survey ||  || align=right data-sort-value="0.62" | 620 m || 
|-id=483 bgcolor=#fefefe
| 525483 ||  || — || March 17, 2005 || Mount Lemmon || Mount Lemmon Survey ||  || align=right data-sort-value="0.69" | 690 m || 
|-id=484 bgcolor=#FFC2E0
| 525484 ||  || — || April 1, 2005 || Socorro || LINEAR || APOPHA || align=right data-sort-value="0.20" | 200 m || 
|-id=485 bgcolor=#fefefe
| 525485 ||  || — || April 1, 2005 || Kitt Peak || Spacewatch ||  || align=right data-sort-value="0.76" | 760 m || 
|-id=486 bgcolor=#E9E9E9
| 525486 ||  || — || April 1, 2005 || Kitt Peak || Spacewatch ||  || align=right | 2.3 km || 
|-id=487 bgcolor=#d6d6d6
| 525487 ||  || — || January 8, 1999 || Kitt Peak || Spacewatch ||  || align=right | 2.4 km || 
|-id=488 bgcolor=#fefefe
| 525488 ||  || — || March 12, 2005 || Kitt Peak || Spacewatch ||  || align=right data-sort-value="0.50" | 500 m || 
|-id=489 bgcolor=#E9E9E9
| 525489 ||  || — || April 2, 2005 || Mount Lemmon || Mount Lemmon Survey ||  || align=right | 2.2 km || 
|-id=490 bgcolor=#d6d6d6
| 525490 ||  || — || April 2, 2005 || Mount Lemmon || Mount Lemmon Survey ||  || align=right | 2.1 km || 
|-id=491 bgcolor=#d6d6d6
| 525491 ||  || — || April 4, 2005 || Mount Lemmon || Mount Lemmon Survey ||  || align=right | 2.0 km || 
|-id=492 bgcolor=#fefefe
| 525492 ||  || — || April 5, 2005 || Mount Lemmon || Mount Lemmon Survey ||  || align=right data-sort-value="0.59" | 590 m || 
|-id=493 bgcolor=#E9E9E9
| 525493 ||  || — || April 2, 2005 || Mount Lemmon || Mount Lemmon Survey ||  || align=right | 2.3 km || 
|-id=494 bgcolor=#fefefe
| 525494 ||  || — || April 5, 2005 || Mount Lemmon || Mount Lemmon Survey ||  || align=right data-sort-value="0.75" | 750 m || 
|-id=495 bgcolor=#E9E9E9
| 525495 ||  || — || April 6, 2005 || Mount Lemmon || Mount Lemmon Survey ||  || align=right | 2.3 km || 
|-id=496 bgcolor=#d6d6d6
| 525496 ||  || — || April 6, 2005 || Mount Lemmon || Mount Lemmon Survey ||  || align=right | 2.3 km || 
|-id=497 bgcolor=#d6d6d6
| 525497 ||  || — || April 6, 2005 || Mount Lemmon || Mount Lemmon Survey ||  || align=right | 2.9 km || 
|-id=498 bgcolor=#FFC2E0
| 525498 ||  || — || April 9, 2005 || Siding Spring || SSS || ATE || align=right data-sort-value="0.13" | 130 m || 
|-id=499 bgcolor=#d6d6d6
| 525499 ||  || — || March 9, 2005 || Mount Lemmon || Mount Lemmon Survey ||  || align=right | 1.8 km || 
|-id=500 bgcolor=#FA8072
| 525500 ||  || — || March 16, 2005 || Catalina || CSS ||  || align=right data-sort-value="0.68" | 680 m || 
|}

525501–525600 

|-bgcolor=#fefefe
| 525501 ||  || — || April 4, 2005 || Catalina || CSS || H || align=right data-sort-value="0.80" | 800 m || 
|-id=502 bgcolor=#fefefe
| 525502 ||  || — || April 6, 2005 || Kitt Peak || Spacewatch ||  || align=right data-sort-value="0.74" | 740 m || 
|-id=503 bgcolor=#d6d6d6
| 525503 ||  || — || February 2, 2005 || Kitt Peak || Spacewatch ||  || align=right | 3.1 km || 
|-id=504 bgcolor=#fefefe
| 525504 ||  || — || March 4, 2005 || Kitt Peak || Spacewatch ||  || align=right data-sort-value="0.66" | 660 m || 
|-id=505 bgcolor=#fefefe
| 525505 ||  || — || April 6, 2005 || Kitt Peak || Spacewatch ||  || align=right data-sort-value="0.63" | 630 m || 
|-id=506 bgcolor=#fefefe
| 525506 ||  || — || April 6, 2005 || Kitt Peak || Spacewatch ||  || align=right data-sort-value="0.82" | 820 m || 
|-id=507 bgcolor=#fefefe
| 525507 ||  || — || April 6, 2005 || Kitt Peak || Spacewatch ||  || align=right data-sort-value="0.71" | 710 m || 
|-id=508 bgcolor=#fefefe
| 525508 ||  || — || February 27, 2001 || Kitt Peak || Spacewatch || NYS || align=right data-sort-value="0.74" | 740 m || 
|-id=509 bgcolor=#fefefe
| 525509 ||  || — || March 17, 2005 || Mount Lemmon || Mount Lemmon Survey ||  || align=right data-sort-value="0.62" | 620 m || 
|-id=510 bgcolor=#d6d6d6
| 525510 ||  || — || October 9, 2002 || Kitt Peak || Spacewatch ||  || align=right | 2.3 km || 
|-id=511 bgcolor=#FA8072
| 525511 ||  || — || April 10, 2005 || Mount Lemmon || Mount Lemmon Survey ||  || align=right data-sort-value="0.82" | 820 m || 
|-id=512 bgcolor=#fefefe
| 525512 ||  || — || April 9, 2005 || Mount Lemmon || Mount Lemmon Survey ||  || align=right data-sort-value="0.73" | 730 m || 
|-id=513 bgcolor=#E9E9E9
| 525513 ||  || — || April 11, 2005 || Kitt Peak || Spacewatch ||  || align=right | 2.2 km || 
|-id=514 bgcolor=#E9E9E9
| 525514 ||  || — || April 11, 2005 || Mount Lemmon || Mount Lemmon Survey ||  || align=right | 2.1 km || 
|-id=515 bgcolor=#E9E9E9
| 525515 ||  || — || April 11, 2005 || Kitt Peak || Spacewatch ||  || align=right | 1.8 km || 
|-id=516 bgcolor=#d6d6d6
| 525516 ||  || — || April 10, 2005 || Kitt Peak || Spacewatch ||  || align=right | 4.1 km || 
|-id=517 bgcolor=#E9E9E9
| 525517 ||  || — || April 10, 2005 || Kitt Peak || Spacewatch ||  || align=right | 2.3 km || 
|-id=518 bgcolor=#d6d6d6
| 525518 ||  || — || April 11, 2005 || Kitt Peak || Spacewatch ||  || align=right | 3.2 km || 
|-id=519 bgcolor=#fefefe
| 525519 ||  || — || April 11, 2005 || Anderson Mesa || LONEOS ||  || align=right data-sort-value="0.90" | 900 m || 
|-id=520 bgcolor=#d6d6d6
| 525520 ||  || — || April 11, 2005 || Kitt Peak || Spacewatch ||  || align=right | 3.9 km || 
|-id=521 bgcolor=#fefefe
| 525521 ||  || — || April 11, 2005 || Kitt Peak || Spacewatch ||  || align=right data-sort-value="0.50" | 500 m || 
|-id=522 bgcolor=#fefefe
| 525522 ||  || — || April 11, 2005 || Kitt Peak || Spacewatch ||  || align=right data-sort-value="0.68" | 680 m || 
|-id=523 bgcolor=#fefefe
| 525523 ||  || — || April 10, 2005 || Mount Lemmon || Mount Lemmon Survey ||  || align=right data-sort-value="0.64" | 640 m || 
|-id=524 bgcolor=#fefefe
| 525524 ||  || — || April 10, 2005 || Mount Lemmon || Mount Lemmon Survey ||  || align=right data-sort-value="0.69" | 690 m || 
|-id=525 bgcolor=#d6d6d6
| 525525 ||  || — || April 11, 2005 || Mount Lemmon || Mount Lemmon Survey ||  || align=right | 2.6 km || 
|-id=526 bgcolor=#d6d6d6
| 525526 ||  || — || April 12, 2005 || Kitt Peak || Spacewatch ||  || align=right | 3.4 km || 
|-id=527 bgcolor=#d6d6d6
| 525527 ||  || — || April 12, 2005 || Mount Lemmon || Mount Lemmon Survey ||  || align=right | 2.7 km || 
|-id=528 bgcolor=#fefefe
| 525528 ||  || — || April 12, 2005 || Kitt Peak || Spacewatch ||  || align=right data-sort-value="0.71" | 710 m || 
|-id=529 bgcolor=#d6d6d6
| 525529 ||  || — || May 30, 2000 || Kitt Peak || Spacewatch ||  || align=right | 2.6 km || 
|-id=530 bgcolor=#fefefe
| 525530 ||  || — || April 14, 2005 || Kitt Peak || Spacewatch ||  || align=right data-sort-value="0.70" | 700 m || 
|-id=531 bgcolor=#d6d6d6
| 525531 ||  || — || November 10, 1996 || Kitt Peak || Spacewatch ||  || align=right | 3.4 km || 
|-id=532 bgcolor=#fefefe
| 525532 ||  || — || April 14, 2005 || Kitt Peak || Spacewatch ||  || align=right data-sort-value="0.61" | 610 m || 
|-id=533 bgcolor=#d6d6d6
| 525533 ||  || — || April 14, 2005 || Kitt Peak || Spacewatch ||  || align=right | 2.4 km || 
|-id=534 bgcolor=#d6d6d6
| 525534 ||  || — || April 14, 2005 || Kitt Peak || Spacewatch ||  || align=right | 2.5 km || 
|-id=535 bgcolor=#E9E9E9
| 525535 ||  || — || April 14, 2005 || Kitt Peak || Spacewatch || DOR || align=right | 2.2 km || 
|-id=536 bgcolor=#d6d6d6
| 525536 ||  || — || April 15, 2005 || Kitt Peak || Spacewatch ||  || align=right | 3.1 km || 
|-id=537 bgcolor=#fefefe
| 525537 ||  || — || April 2, 2005 || Mount Lemmon || Mount Lemmon Survey ||  || align=right data-sort-value="0.65" | 650 m || 
|-id=538 bgcolor=#d6d6d6
| 525538 ||  || — || April 2, 2005 || Kitt Peak || Spacewatch ||  || align=right | 2.8 km || 
|-id=539 bgcolor=#fefefe
| 525539 ||  || — || September 18, 1995 || Kitt Peak || Spacewatch || H || align=right data-sort-value="0.49" | 490 m || 
|-id=540 bgcolor=#fefefe
| 525540 ||  || — || April 4, 2005 || Mount Lemmon || Mount Lemmon Survey ||  || align=right data-sort-value="0.71" | 710 m || 
|-id=541 bgcolor=#fefefe
| 525541 ||  || — || April 7, 2005 || Kitt Peak || Spacewatch ||  || align=right data-sort-value="0.56" | 560 m || 
|-id=542 bgcolor=#d6d6d6
| 525542 ||  || — || April 10, 2005 || Kitt Peak || Spacewatch ||  || align=right | 2.4 km || 
|-id=543 bgcolor=#fefefe
| 525543 ||  || — || April 10, 2005 || Kitt Peak || Spacewatch ||  || align=right data-sort-value="0.85" | 850 m || 
|-id=544 bgcolor=#fefefe
| 525544 ||  || — || April 10, 2005 || Kitt Peak || Spacewatch ||  || align=right | 1.1 km || 
|-id=545 bgcolor=#fefefe
| 525545 ||  || — || December 16, 2007 || Kitt Peak || Spacewatch ||  || align=right data-sort-value="0.93" | 930 m || 
|-id=546 bgcolor=#fefefe
| 525546 ||  || — || April 4, 2005 || Catalina || CSS ||  || align=right data-sort-value="0.54" | 540 m || 
|-id=547 bgcolor=#d6d6d6
| 525547 ||  || — || April 10, 2005 || Mount Lemmon || Mount Lemmon Survey ||  || align=right | 3.2 km || 
|-id=548 bgcolor=#d6d6d6
| 525548 ||  || — || April 10, 2005 || Mount Lemmon || Mount Lemmon Survey ||  || align=right | 2.5 km || 
|-id=549 bgcolor=#fefefe
| 525549 ||  || — || April 17, 2005 || Kitt Peak || Spacewatch || H || align=right data-sort-value="0.59" | 590 m || 
|-id=550 bgcolor=#E9E9E9
| 525550 ||  || — || April 28, 2005 || Mayhill || A. Lowe ||  || align=right | 2.2 km || 
|-id=551 bgcolor=#E9E9E9
| 525551 ||  || — || April 18, 2005 || Kitt Peak || Spacewatch ||  || align=right | 1.8 km || 
|-id=552 bgcolor=#FFC2E0
| 525552 ||  || — || May 3, 2005 || Catalina || CSS || AMO || align=right data-sort-value="0.62" | 620 m || 
|-id=553 bgcolor=#d6d6d6
| 525553 ||  || — || March 14, 2005 || Mount Lemmon || Mount Lemmon Survey ||  || align=right | 2.8 km || 
|-id=554 bgcolor=#fefefe
| 525554 ||  || — || May 4, 2005 || Mount Lemmon || Mount Lemmon Survey ||  || align=right data-sort-value="0.71" | 710 m || 
|-id=555 bgcolor=#fefefe
| 525555 ||  || — || December 1, 2003 || Kitt Peak || Spacewatch ||  || align=right data-sort-value="0.80" | 800 m || 
|-id=556 bgcolor=#fefefe
| 525556 ||  || — || March 12, 2005 || Kitt Peak || Spacewatch ||  || align=right data-sort-value="0.89" | 890 m || 
|-id=557 bgcolor=#fefefe
| 525557 ||  || — || May 4, 2005 || Mount Lemmon || Mount Lemmon Survey ||  || align=right data-sort-value="0.56" | 560 m || 
|-id=558 bgcolor=#fefefe
| 525558 ||  || — || October 6, 1996 || Kitt Peak || Spacewatch ||  || align=right data-sort-value="0.81" | 810 m || 
|-id=559 bgcolor=#fefefe
| 525559 ||  || — || May 8, 2005 || Kitt Peak || Spacewatch ||  || align=right data-sort-value="0.88" | 880 m || 
|-id=560 bgcolor=#d6d6d6
| 525560 ||  || — || May 3, 2005 || Kitt Peak || Spacewatch ||  || align=right | 2.7 km || 
|-id=561 bgcolor=#fefefe
| 525561 ||  || — || May 4, 2005 || Kitt Peak || Spacewatch ||  || align=right data-sort-value="0.75" | 750 m || 
|-id=562 bgcolor=#fefefe
| 525562 ||  || — || April 2, 2005 || Mount Lemmon || Mount Lemmon Survey || MAS || align=right data-sort-value="0.61" | 610 m || 
|-id=563 bgcolor=#d6d6d6
| 525563 ||  || — || May 4, 2005 || Kitt Peak || Spacewatch ||  || align=right | 2.7 km || 
|-id=564 bgcolor=#fefefe
| 525564 ||  || — || May 4, 2005 || Kitt Peak || Spacewatch ||  || align=right | 1.3 km || 
|-id=565 bgcolor=#fefefe
| 525565 ||  || — || May 6, 2005 || Kitt Peak || Spacewatch || H || align=right data-sort-value="0.47" | 470 m || 
|-id=566 bgcolor=#fefefe
| 525566 ||  || — || May 6, 2005 || Kitt Peak || Spacewatch ||  || align=right data-sort-value="0.82" | 820 m || 
|-id=567 bgcolor=#d6d6d6
| 525567 ||  || — || May 8, 2005 || Kitt Peak || Spacewatch ||  || align=right | 2.6 km || 
|-id=568 bgcolor=#fefefe
| 525568 ||  || — || May 4, 2005 || Kitt Peak || Spacewatch ||  || align=right data-sort-value="0.67" | 670 m || 
|-id=569 bgcolor=#fefefe
| 525569 ||  || — || May 10, 2005 || Mount Lemmon || Mount Lemmon Survey ||  || align=right data-sort-value="0.85" | 850 m || 
|-id=570 bgcolor=#d6d6d6
| 525570 ||  || — || May 10, 2005 || Anderson Mesa || LONEOS ||  || align=right | 3.0 km || 
|-id=571 bgcolor=#d6d6d6
| 525571 ||  || — || May 11, 2005 || Kitt Peak || Spacewatch ||  || align=right | 3.4 km || 
|-id=572 bgcolor=#E9E9E9
| 525572 ||  || — || May 7, 2005 || Mount Lemmon || Mount Lemmon Survey ||  || align=right data-sort-value="0.78" | 780 m || 
|-id=573 bgcolor=#d6d6d6
| 525573 ||  || — || March 14, 2005 || Mount Lemmon || Mount Lemmon Survey ||  || align=right | 2.6 km || 
|-id=574 bgcolor=#fefefe
| 525574 ||  || — || May 8, 2005 || Kitt Peak || Spacewatch ||  || align=right data-sort-value="0.92" | 920 m || 
|-id=575 bgcolor=#E9E9E9
| 525575 ||  || — || May 9, 2005 || Kitt Peak || Spacewatch ||  || align=right | 2.3 km || 
|-id=576 bgcolor=#E9E9E9
| 525576 ||  || — || May 11, 2005 || Mount Lemmon || Mount Lemmon Survey ||  || align=right | 2.1 km || 
|-id=577 bgcolor=#d6d6d6
| 525577 ||  || — || April 16, 2005 || Kitt Peak || Spacewatch ||  || align=right | 3.7 km || 
|-id=578 bgcolor=#d6d6d6
| 525578 ||  || — || May 10, 2005 || Kitt Peak || Spacewatch ||  || align=right | 2.9 km || 
|-id=579 bgcolor=#fefefe
| 525579 ||  || — || May 10, 2005 || Kitt Peak || Spacewatch ||  || align=right data-sort-value="0.77" | 770 m || 
|-id=580 bgcolor=#d6d6d6
| 525580 ||  || — || May 10, 2005 || Kitt Peak || Spacewatch ||  || align=right | 2.8 km || 
|-id=581 bgcolor=#fefefe
| 525581 ||  || — || May 11, 2005 || Kitt Peak || Spacewatch ||  || align=right data-sort-value="0.91" | 910 m || 
|-id=582 bgcolor=#E9E9E9
| 525582 ||  || — || May 13, 2005 || Kitt Peak || Spacewatch ||  || align=right | 2.5 km || 
|-id=583 bgcolor=#fefefe
| 525583 ||  || — || April 13, 2005 || Catalina || CSS ||  || align=right data-sort-value="0.71" | 710 m || 
|-id=584 bgcolor=#fefefe
| 525584 ||  || — || May 13, 2005 || Kitt Peak || Spacewatch ||  || align=right data-sort-value="0.77" | 770 m || 
|-id=585 bgcolor=#d6d6d6
| 525585 ||  || — || April 30, 2005 || Kitt Peak || Spacewatch || EOS || align=right | 1.9 km || 
|-id=586 bgcolor=#fefefe
| 525586 ||  || — || May 15, 2005 || Mount Lemmon || Mount Lemmon Survey ||  || align=right data-sort-value="0.75" | 750 m || 
|-id=587 bgcolor=#fefefe
| 525587 ||  || — || March 9, 2005 || Mount Lemmon || Mount Lemmon Survey ||  || align=right data-sort-value="0.59" | 590 m || 
|-id=588 bgcolor=#d6d6d6
| 525588 ||  || — || May 7, 2005 || Kitt Peak || Spacewatch ||  || align=right | 3.8 km || 
|-id=589 bgcolor=#d6d6d6
| 525589 ||  || — || March 12, 2005 || Mount Lemmon || Mount Lemmon Survey ||  || align=right | 3.4 km || 
|-id=590 bgcolor=#fefefe
| 525590 ||  || — || May 8, 2005 || Kitt Peak || Spacewatch ||  || align=right data-sort-value="0.72" | 720 m || 
|-id=591 bgcolor=#fefefe
| 525591 ||  || — || May 8, 2005 || Mount Lemmon || Mount Lemmon Survey ||  || align=right data-sort-value="0.83" | 830 m || 
|-id=592 bgcolor=#fefefe
| 525592 ||  || — || May 10, 2005 || Mount Lemmon || Mount Lemmon Survey ||  || align=right data-sort-value="0.77" | 770 m || 
|-id=593 bgcolor=#fefefe
| 525593 ||  || — || April 16, 2005 || Kitt Peak || Spacewatch ||  || align=right data-sort-value="0.55" | 550 m || 
|-id=594 bgcolor=#fefefe
| 525594 ||  || — || April 7, 2005 || Kitt Peak || Spacewatch ||  || align=right data-sort-value="0.60" | 600 m || 
|-id=595 bgcolor=#C2E0FF
| 525595 ||  || — || May 11, 2005 || Cerro Tololo || M. W. Buie || cubewano (cold)critical || align=right | 225 km || 
|-id=596 bgcolor=#C2E0FF
| 525596 ||  || — || May 11, 2005 || Cerro Tololo || M. W. Buie || cubewano (cold) || align=right | 193 km || 
|-id=597 bgcolor=#E9E9E9
| 525597 ||  || — || May 11, 2005 || Kitt Peak || Spacewatch ||  || align=right | 2.2 km || 
|-id=598 bgcolor=#d6d6d6
| 525598 ||  || — || April 10, 2010 || Mount Lemmon || Mount Lemmon Survey ||  || align=right | 1.9 km || 
|-id=599 bgcolor=#E9E9E9
| 525599 ||  || — || October 17, 2007 || Mount Lemmon || Mount Lemmon Survey ||  || align=right | 2.2 km || 
|-id=600 bgcolor=#d6d6d6
| 525600 ||  || — || December 29, 2008 || Kitt Peak || Spacewatch ||  || align=right | 3.7 km || 
|}

525601–525700 

|-bgcolor=#d6d6d6
| 525601 ||  || — || May 14, 2005 || Mount Lemmon || Mount Lemmon Survey ||  || align=right | 2.9 km || 
|-id=602 bgcolor=#d6d6d6
| 525602 ||  || — || May 15, 2005 || Mount Lemmon || Mount Lemmon Survey ||  || align=right | 2.4 km || 
|-id=603 bgcolor=#fefefe
| 525603 ||  || — || May 15, 2005 || Mount Lemmon || Mount Lemmon Survey ||  || align=right data-sort-value="0.59" | 590 m || 
|-id=604 bgcolor=#fefefe
| 525604 ||  || — || May 10, 2005 || Kitt Peak || Spacewatch ||  || align=right data-sort-value="0.93" | 930 m || 
|-id=605 bgcolor=#E9E9E9
| 525605 ||  || — || May 16, 2005 || Catalina || CSS ||  || align=right | 1.4 km || 
|-id=606 bgcolor=#fefefe
| 525606 ||  || — || April 30, 2005 || Kitt Peak || Spacewatch || PHO || align=right data-sort-value="0.84" | 840 m || 
|-id=607 bgcolor=#fefefe
| 525607 ||  || — || May 20, 2005 || Mount Lemmon || Mount Lemmon Survey ||  || align=right data-sort-value="0.62" | 620 m || 
|-id=608 bgcolor=#fefefe
| 525608 ||  || — || June 1, 2005 || Kitt Peak || Spacewatch || NYS || align=right data-sort-value="0.52" | 520 m || 
|-id=609 bgcolor=#d6d6d6
| 525609 ||  || — || May 15, 2005 || Mount Lemmon || Mount Lemmon Survey ||  || align=right | 2.7 km || 
|-id=610 bgcolor=#E9E9E9
| 525610 ||  || — || June 5, 2005 || Kitt Peak || Spacewatch ||  || align=right | 1.0 km || 
|-id=611 bgcolor=#E9E9E9
| 525611 ||  || — || June 8, 2005 || Kitt Peak || Spacewatch ||  || align=right data-sort-value="0.88" | 880 m || 
|-id=612 bgcolor=#d6d6d6
| 525612 ||  || — || June 8, 2005 || Kitt Peak || Spacewatch ||  || align=right | 2.9 km || 
|-id=613 bgcolor=#E9E9E9
| 525613 ||  || — || June 9, 2005 || Kitt Peak || Spacewatch ||  || align=right | 1.0 km || 
|-id=614 bgcolor=#fefefe
| 525614 ||  || — || June 10, 2005 || Kitt Peak || Spacewatch ||  || align=right data-sort-value="0.81" | 810 m || 
|-id=615 bgcolor=#fefefe
| 525615 ||  || — || June 8, 2005 || Kitt Peak || Spacewatch ||  || align=right data-sort-value="0.96" | 960 m || 
|-id=616 bgcolor=#d6d6d6
| 525616 ||  || — || June 11, 2005 || Kitt Peak || Spacewatch || Tj (2.98) || align=right | 3.2 km || 
|-id=617 bgcolor=#fefefe
| 525617 ||  || — || June 13, 2005 || Kitt Peak || Spacewatch ||  || align=right | 1.1 km || 
|-id=618 bgcolor=#E9E9E9
| 525618 ||  || — || June 14, 2005 || Mount Lemmon || Mount Lemmon Survey ||  || align=right | 1.0 km || 
|-id=619 bgcolor=#E9E9E9
| 525619 ||  || — || June 15, 2005 || Mount Lemmon || Mount Lemmon Survey ||  || align=right | 1.4 km || 
|-id=620 bgcolor=#fefefe
| 525620 ||  || — || June 15, 2005 || Mount Lemmon || Mount Lemmon Survey ||  || align=right data-sort-value="0.66" | 660 m || 
|-id=621 bgcolor=#d6d6d6
| 525621 ||  || — || June 18, 2005 || Mount Lemmon || Mount Lemmon Survey ||  || align=right | 3.7 km || 
|-id=622 bgcolor=#fefefe
| 525622 ||  || — || June 26, 2005 || Mount Lemmon || Mount Lemmon Survey ||  || align=right data-sort-value="0.85" | 850 m || 
|-id=623 bgcolor=#d6d6d6
| 525623 ||  || — || June 18, 2005 || Mount Lemmon || Mount Lemmon Survey ||  || align=right | 3.1 km || 
|-id=624 bgcolor=#d6d6d6
| 525624 ||  || — || May 20, 2005 || Mount Lemmon || Mount Lemmon Survey ||  || align=right | 2.7 km || 
|-id=625 bgcolor=#d6d6d6
| 525625 ||  || — || June 27, 2005 || Kitt Peak || Spacewatch ||  || align=right | 3.7 km || 
|-id=626 bgcolor=#E9E9E9
| 525626 ||  || — || June 13, 2005 || Mount Lemmon || Mount Lemmon Survey ||  || align=right data-sort-value="0.87" | 870 m || 
|-id=627 bgcolor=#E9E9E9
| 525627 ||  || — || June 27, 2005 || Kitt Peak || Spacewatch ||  || align=right data-sort-value="0.90" | 900 m || 
|-id=628 bgcolor=#E9E9E9
| 525628 ||  || — || June 29, 2005 || Kitt Peak || Spacewatch ||  || align=right | 1.1 km || 
|-id=629 bgcolor=#d6d6d6
| 525629 ||  || — || June 29, 2005 || Kitt Peak || Spacewatch ||  || align=right | 3.4 km || 
|-id=630 bgcolor=#fefefe
| 525630 ||  || — || June 13, 2005 || Mount Lemmon || Mount Lemmon Survey || V || align=right data-sort-value="0.69" | 690 m || 
|-id=631 bgcolor=#fefefe
| 525631 ||  || — || June 30, 2005 || Kitt Peak || Spacewatch ||  || align=right data-sort-value="0.96" | 960 m || 
|-id=632 bgcolor=#E9E9E9
| 525632 ||  || — || June 30, 2005 || Kitt Peak || Spacewatch ||  || align=right | 1.2 km || 
|-id=633 bgcolor=#E9E9E9
| 525633 ||  || — || June 29, 2005 || Kitt Peak || Spacewatch ||  || align=right | 1.6 km || 
|-id=634 bgcolor=#fefefe
| 525634 ||  || — || June 30, 2005 || Kitt Peak || Spacewatch ||  || align=right data-sort-value="0.59" | 590 m || 
|-id=635 bgcolor=#d6d6d6
| 525635 ||  || — || May 21, 2005 || Mount Lemmon || Mount Lemmon Survey ||  || align=right | 2.3 km || 
|-id=636 bgcolor=#d6d6d6
| 525636 ||  || — || July 4, 2005 || Mount Lemmon || Mount Lemmon Survey ||  || align=right | 2.7 km || 
|-id=637 bgcolor=#fefefe
| 525637 ||  || — || May 20, 2005 || Mount Lemmon || Mount Lemmon Survey ||  || align=right data-sort-value="0.70" | 700 m || 
|-id=638 bgcolor=#d6d6d6
| 525638 ||  || — || July 2, 2005 || Kitt Peak || Spacewatch ||  || align=right | 3.2 km || 
|-id=639 bgcolor=#E9E9E9
| 525639 ||  || — || July 2, 2005 || Kitt Peak || Spacewatch ||  || align=right | 1.2 km || 
|-id=640 bgcolor=#fefefe
| 525640 ||  || — || July 2, 2005 || Kitt Peak || Spacewatch || H || align=right data-sort-value="0.55" | 550 m || 
|-id=641 bgcolor=#d6d6d6
| 525641 ||  || — || July 4, 2005 || Kitt Peak || Spacewatch ||  || align=right | 3.5 km || 
|-id=642 bgcolor=#d6d6d6
| 525642 ||  || — || July 4, 2005 || Kitt Peak || Spacewatch ||  || align=right | 3.1 km || 
|-id=643 bgcolor=#d6d6d6
| 525643 ||  || — || July 4, 2005 || Kitt Peak || Spacewatch ||  || align=right | 2.9 km || 
|-id=644 bgcolor=#d6d6d6
| 525644 ||  || — || July 4, 2005 || Kitt Peak || Spacewatch ||  || align=right | 2.7 km || 
|-id=645 bgcolor=#fefefe
| 525645 ||  || — || July 4, 2005 || Kitt Peak || Spacewatch ||  || align=right data-sort-value="0.70" | 700 m || 
|-id=646 bgcolor=#d6d6d6
| 525646 ||  || — || July 5, 2005 || Kitt Peak || Spacewatch ||  || align=right | 2.1 km || 
|-id=647 bgcolor=#fefefe
| 525647 ||  || — || June 17, 2005 || Mount Lemmon || Mount Lemmon Survey ||  || align=right data-sort-value="0.76" | 760 m || 
|-id=648 bgcolor=#d6d6d6
| 525648 ||  || — || July 6, 2005 || Campo Imperatore || CINEOS ||  || align=right | 3.6 km || 
|-id=649 bgcolor=#E9E9E9
| 525649 ||  || — || July 5, 2005 || Mount Lemmon || Mount Lemmon Survey ||  || align=right data-sort-value="0.90" | 900 m || 
|-id=650 bgcolor=#E9E9E9
| 525650 ||  || — || July 5, 2005 || Mount Lemmon || Mount Lemmon Survey ||  || align=right | 1.7 km || 
|-id=651 bgcolor=#fefefe
| 525651 ||  || — || July 6, 2005 || Kitt Peak || Spacewatch ||  || align=right data-sort-value="0.89" | 890 m || 
|-id=652 bgcolor=#E9E9E9
| 525652 ||  || — || June 18, 2005 || Mount Lemmon || Mount Lemmon Survey ||  || align=right | 1.0 km || 
|-id=653 bgcolor=#fefefe
| 525653 ||  || — || June 15, 2005 || Mount Lemmon || Mount Lemmon Survey ||  || align=right data-sort-value="0.62" | 620 m || 
|-id=654 bgcolor=#d6d6d6
| 525654 ||  || — || July 5, 2005 || Mount Lemmon || Mount Lemmon Survey ||  || align=right | 2.0 km || 
|-id=655 bgcolor=#d6d6d6
| 525655 ||  || — || July 5, 2005 || Mount Lemmon || Mount Lemmon Survey ||  || align=right | 2.6 km || 
|-id=656 bgcolor=#E9E9E9
| 525656 ||  || — || May 15, 2005 || Mount Lemmon || Mount Lemmon Survey ||  || align=right | 1.6 km || 
|-id=657 bgcolor=#E9E9E9
| 525657 ||  || — || July 5, 2005 || Kitt Peak || Spacewatch ||  || align=right | 1.0 km || 
|-id=658 bgcolor=#d6d6d6
| 525658 ||  || — || July 8, 2005 || Kitt Peak || Spacewatch ||  || align=right | 2.6 km || 
|-id=659 bgcolor=#d6d6d6
| 525659 ||  || — || June 30, 2005 || Kitt Peak || Spacewatch ||  || align=right | 2.7 km || 
|-id=660 bgcolor=#d6d6d6
| 525660 ||  || — || July 10, 2005 || Kitt Peak || Spacewatch ||  || align=right | 3.5 km || 
|-id=661 bgcolor=#fefefe
| 525661 ||  || — || July 5, 2005 || Kitt Peak || Spacewatch ||  || align=right data-sort-value="0.73" | 730 m || 
|-id=662 bgcolor=#E9E9E9
| 525662 ||  || — || July 6, 2005 || Kitt Peak || Spacewatch ||  || align=right | 1.3 km || 
|-id=663 bgcolor=#fefefe
| 525663 ||  || — || July 4, 2005 || Kitt Peak || Spacewatch ||  || align=right data-sort-value="0.60" | 600 m || 
|-id=664 bgcolor=#fefefe
| 525664 ||  || — || July 9, 2005 || Kitt Peak || Spacewatch ||  || align=right data-sort-value="0.86" | 860 m || 
|-id=665 bgcolor=#E9E9E9
| 525665 ||  || — || July 9, 2005 || Kitt Peak || Spacewatch ||  || align=right data-sort-value="0.90" | 900 m || 
|-id=666 bgcolor=#d6d6d6
| 525666 ||  || — || July 11, 2005 || Mount Lemmon || Mount Lemmon Survey ||  || align=right | 3.1 km || 
|-id=667 bgcolor=#d6d6d6
| 525667 ||  || — || June 17, 2005 || Mount Lemmon || Mount Lemmon Survey ||  || align=right | 3.2 km || 
|-id=668 bgcolor=#fefefe
| 525668 ||  || — || July 4, 2005 || Mount Lemmon || Mount Lemmon Survey ||  || align=right data-sort-value="0.58" | 580 m || 
|-id=669 bgcolor=#d6d6d6
| 525669 ||  || — || June 13, 2005 || Mount Lemmon || Mount Lemmon Survey ||  || align=right | 2.6 km || 
|-id=670 bgcolor=#d6d6d6
| 525670 ||  || — || July 10, 2005 || Kitt Peak || Spacewatch ||  || align=right | 3.8 km || 
|-id=671 bgcolor=#d6d6d6
| 525671 ||  || — || July 11, 2005 || Kitt Peak || Spacewatch ||  || align=right | 3.0 km || 
|-id=672 bgcolor=#d6d6d6
| 525672 ||  || — || July 11, 2005 || Kitt Peak || Spacewatch ||  || align=right | 1.7 km || 
|-id=673 bgcolor=#d6d6d6
| 525673 ||  || — || July 1, 2005 || Kitt Peak || Spacewatch ||  || align=right | 3.1 km || 
|-id=674 bgcolor=#fefefe
| 525674 ||  || — || July 6, 2005 || Kitt Peak || Spacewatch ||  || align=right data-sort-value="0.65" | 650 m || 
|-id=675 bgcolor=#d6d6d6
| 525675 ||  || — || July 6, 2005 || Kitt Peak || Spacewatch ||  || align=right | 2.8 km || 
|-id=676 bgcolor=#E9E9E9
| 525676 ||  || — || July 7, 2005 || Kitt Peak || Spacewatch ||  || align=right data-sort-value="0.96" | 960 m || 
|-id=677 bgcolor=#fefefe
| 525677 ||  || — || November 1, 2013 || Mount Lemmon || Mount Lemmon Survey ||  || align=right data-sort-value="0.89" | 890 m || 
|-id=678 bgcolor=#E9E9E9
| 525678 ||  || — || July 12, 2005 || Anderson Mesa || LONEOS ||  || align=right | 1.5 km || 
|-id=679 bgcolor=#E9E9E9
| 525679 ||  || — || July 8, 2005 || Kitt Peak || Spacewatch ||  || align=right | 1.1 km || 
|-id=680 bgcolor=#fefefe
| 525680 ||  || — || July 30, 2005 || Palomar || NEAT || NYS || align=right data-sort-value="0.57" | 570 m || 
|-id=681 bgcolor=#fefefe
| 525681 ||  || — || August 7, 2005 || Siding Spring || SSS ||  || align=right | 1.2 km || 
|-id=682 bgcolor=#E9E9E9
| 525682 ||  || — || August 3, 2005 || Saint-Sulpice || Saint-Sulpice Obs. ||  || align=right data-sort-value="0.93" | 930 m || 
|-id=683 bgcolor=#E9E9E9
| 525683 ||  || — || July 15, 2005 || Kitt Peak || Spacewatch ||  || align=right | 1.1 km || 
|-id=684 bgcolor=#d6d6d6
| 525684 ||  || — || August 26, 2005 || Anderson Mesa || LONEOS || 3:2 || align=right | 4.0 km || 
|-id=685 bgcolor=#fefefe
| 525685 ||  || — || August 27, 2005 || Kitt Peak || Spacewatch ||  || align=right data-sort-value="0.67" | 670 m || 
|-id=686 bgcolor=#E9E9E9
| 525686 ||  || — || August 27, 2005 || Kitt Peak || Spacewatch ||  || align=right data-sort-value="0.94" | 940 m || 
|-id=687 bgcolor=#E9E9E9
| 525687 ||  || — || August 27, 2005 || Kitt Peak || Spacewatch ||  || align=right | 1.5 km || 
|-id=688 bgcolor=#E9E9E9
| 525688 ||  || — || August 27, 2005 || Kitt Peak || Spacewatch ||  || align=right data-sort-value="0.76" | 760 m || 
|-id=689 bgcolor=#E9E9E9
| 525689 ||  || — || August 25, 2005 || Palomar || NEAT ||  || align=right | 1.6 km || 
|-id=690 bgcolor=#d6d6d6
| 525690 ||  || — || August 26, 2005 || Palomar || NEAT ||  || align=right | 1.7 km || 
|-id=691 bgcolor=#d6d6d6
| 525691 ||  || — || August 27, 2005 || Kitt Peak || Spacewatch ||  || align=right | 2.1 km || 
|-id=692 bgcolor=#E9E9E9
| 525692 ||  || — || August 26, 2005 || Anderson Mesa || LONEOS ||  || align=right data-sort-value="0.98" | 980 m || 
|-id=693 bgcolor=#d6d6d6
| 525693 ||  || — || August 28, 2005 || Kitt Peak || Spacewatch ||  || align=right | 2.8 km || 
|-id=694 bgcolor=#E9E9E9
| 525694 ||  || — || August 28, 2005 || Siding Spring || SSS ||  || align=right data-sort-value="0.96" | 960 m || 
|-id=695 bgcolor=#E9E9E9
| 525695 ||  || — || August 29, 2005 || Kitt Peak || Spacewatch ||  || align=right | 1.6 km || 
|-id=696 bgcolor=#fefefe
| 525696 ||  || — || August 25, 2005 || Palomar || NEAT ||  || align=right data-sort-value="0.60" | 600 m || 
|-id=697 bgcolor=#d6d6d6
| 525697 ||  || — || July 4, 2005 || Mount Lemmon || Mount Lemmon Survey ||  || align=right | 5.8 km || 
|-id=698 bgcolor=#d6d6d6
| 525698 ||  || — || August 27, 2005 || Palomar || NEAT || 3:2 || align=right | 3.9 km || 
|-id=699 bgcolor=#E9E9E9
| 525699 ||  || — || August 27, 2005 || Palomar || NEAT ||  || align=right data-sort-value="0.86" | 860 m || 
|-id=700 bgcolor=#fefefe
| 525700 ||  || — || July 5, 2005 || Kitt Peak || Spacewatch ||  || align=right data-sort-value="0.64" | 640 m || 
|}

525701–525800 

|-bgcolor=#E9E9E9
| 525701 ||  || — || August 27, 2005 || Palomar || NEAT ||  || align=right | 1.2 km || 
|-id=702 bgcolor=#E9E9E9
| 525702 ||  || — || August 27, 2005 || Palomar || NEAT ||  || align=right | 1.1 km || 
|-id=703 bgcolor=#d6d6d6
| 525703 ||  || — || August 28, 2005 || Kitt Peak || Spacewatch ||  || align=right | 3.1 km || 
|-id=704 bgcolor=#E9E9E9
| 525704 ||  || — || August 28, 2005 || Kitt Peak || Spacewatch ||  || align=right | 1.1 km || 
|-id=705 bgcolor=#E9E9E9
| 525705 ||  || — || August 28, 2005 || Kitt Peak || Spacewatch ||  || align=right | 1.1 km || 
|-id=706 bgcolor=#E9E9E9
| 525706 ||  || — || August 28, 2005 || Kitt Peak || Spacewatch ||  || align=right data-sort-value="0.83" | 830 m || 
|-id=707 bgcolor=#E9E9E9
| 525707 ||  || — || August 28, 2005 || Kitt Peak || Spacewatch ||  || align=right | 1.2 km || 
|-id=708 bgcolor=#E9E9E9
| 525708 ||  || — || August 30, 2005 || Kitt Peak || Spacewatch ||  || align=right | 1.5 km || 
|-id=709 bgcolor=#E9E9E9
| 525709 ||  || — || August 28, 2005 || Kitt Peak || Spacewatch ||  || align=right | 1.3 km || 
|-id=710 bgcolor=#E9E9E9
| 525710 ||  || — || August 31, 2005 || Palomar || NEAT || ADE || align=right | 1.8 km || 
|-id=711 bgcolor=#E9E9E9
| 525711 ||  || — || August 31, 2005 || Anderson Mesa || LONEOS ||  || align=right | 1.5 km || 
|-id=712 bgcolor=#fefefe
| 525712 ||  || — || August 30, 2005 || Kitt Peak || Spacewatch ||  || align=right data-sort-value="0.42" | 420 m || 
|-id=713 bgcolor=#E9E9E9
| 525713 ||  || — || August 30, 2005 || Kitt Peak || Spacewatch || JUN || align=right data-sort-value="0.66" | 660 m || 
|-id=714 bgcolor=#fefefe
| 525714 ||  || — || August 30, 2005 || Kitt Peak || Spacewatch ||  || align=right data-sort-value="0.83" | 830 m || 
|-id=715 bgcolor=#E9E9E9
| 525715 ||  || — || September 4, 2005 || Hormersdorf || J. Lorenz ||  || align=right data-sort-value="0.93" | 930 m || 
|-id=716 bgcolor=#d6d6d6
| 525716 ||  || — || August 29, 2005 || Anderson Mesa || LONEOS ||  || align=right | 2.9 km || 
|-id=717 bgcolor=#fefefe
| 525717 ||  || — || September 1, 2005 || Kitt Peak || Spacewatch ||  || align=right data-sort-value="0.83" | 830 m || 
|-id=718 bgcolor=#d6d6d6
| 525718 ||  || — || March 23, 2003 || Kitt Peak || Spacewatch ||  || align=right | 2.8 km || 
|-id=719 bgcolor=#d6d6d6
| 525719 ||  || — || September 1, 2005 || Kitt Peak || Spacewatch || 3:2 || align=right | 3.0 km || 
|-id=720 bgcolor=#E9E9E9
| 525720 ||  || — || September 1, 2005 || Anderson Mesa || LONEOS ||  || align=right | 1.7 km || 
|-id=721 bgcolor=#d6d6d6
| 525721 ||  || — || September 1, 2005 || Kitt Peak || Spacewatch ||  || align=right | 3.1 km || 
|-id=722 bgcolor=#d6d6d6
| 525722 ||  || — || September 1, 2005 || Kitt Peak || Spacewatch ||  || align=right | 3.0 km || 
|-id=723 bgcolor=#E9E9E9
| 525723 ||  || — || September 1, 2005 || Kitt Peak || Spacewatch ||  || align=right | 1.6 km || 
|-id=724 bgcolor=#E9E9E9
| 525724 ||  || — || August 30, 2005 || Anderson Mesa || LONEOS ||  || align=right | 2.7 km || 
|-id=725 bgcolor=#E9E9E9
| 525725 ||  || — || August 29, 2005 || Kitt Peak || Spacewatch ||  || align=right data-sort-value="0.91" | 910 m || 
|-id=726 bgcolor=#E9E9E9
| 525726 ||  || — || September 11, 2005 || Kitt Peak || Spacewatch ||  || align=right | 1.4 km || 
|-id=727 bgcolor=#fefefe
| 525727 ||  || — || September 13, 2005 || Kitt Peak || Spacewatch ||  || align=right data-sort-value="0.71" | 710 m || 
|-id=728 bgcolor=#E9E9E9
| 525728 ||  || — || August 31, 2005 || Kitt Peak || Spacewatch ||  || align=right data-sort-value="0.94" | 940 m || 
|-id=729 bgcolor=#C2E0FF
| 525729 ||  || — || September 9, 2005 || Apache Point || A. C. Becker, A. W. Puckett, J. Kubica || other TNO || align=right | 243 km || 
|-id=730 bgcolor=#E9E9E9
| 525730 ||  || — || September 22, 2005 || Palomar || NEAT ||  || align=right | 1.6 km || 
|-id=731 bgcolor=#fefefe
| 525731 ||  || — || September 24, 2005 || Kitt Peak || Spacewatch ||  || align=right data-sort-value="0.69" | 690 m || 
|-id=732 bgcolor=#E9E9E9
| 525732 ||  || — || September 26, 2005 || Kitt Peak || Spacewatch ||  || align=right | 1.2 km || 
|-id=733 bgcolor=#E9E9E9
| 525733 ||  || — || September 26, 2005 || Kitt Peak || Spacewatch ||  || align=right | 1.2 km || 
|-id=734 bgcolor=#E9E9E9
| 525734 ||  || — || September 26, 2005 || Kitt Peak || Spacewatch ||  || align=right | 1.1 km || 
|-id=735 bgcolor=#E9E9E9
| 525735 ||  || — || August 30, 2005 || Kitt Peak || Spacewatch ||  || align=right | 1.1 km || 
|-id=736 bgcolor=#E9E9E9
| 525736 ||  || — || September 23, 2005 || Catalina || CSS ||  || align=right | 1.4 km || 
|-id=737 bgcolor=#E9E9E9
| 525737 ||  || — || September 23, 2005 || Kitt Peak || Spacewatch ||  || align=right | 1.6 km || 
|-id=738 bgcolor=#E9E9E9
| 525738 ||  || — || September 23, 2005 || Kitt Peak || Spacewatch ||  || align=right | 1.3 km || 
|-id=739 bgcolor=#fefefe
| 525739 ||  || — || September 23, 2005 || Kitt Peak || Spacewatch || NYS || align=right data-sort-value="0.77" | 770 m || 
|-id=740 bgcolor=#d6d6d6
| 525740 ||  || — || September 24, 2005 || Kitt Peak || Spacewatch ||  || align=right | 2.7 km || 
|-id=741 bgcolor=#E9E9E9
| 525741 ||  || — || September 24, 2005 || Kitt Peak || Spacewatch ||  || align=right | 1.2 km || 
|-id=742 bgcolor=#E9E9E9
| 525742 ||  || — || September 24, 2005 || Kitt Peak || Spacewatch ||  || align=right | 1.2 km || 
|-id=743 bgcolor=#E9E9E9
| 525743 ||  || — || September 24, 2005 || Kitt Peak || Spacewatch ||  || align=right data-sort-value="0.92" | 920 m || 
|-id=744 bgcolor=#E9E9E9
| 525744 ||  || — || August 30, 2005 || Anderson Mesa || LONEOS ||  || align=right | 1.6 km || 
|-id=745 bgcolor=#E9E9E9
| 525745 ||  || — || September 25, 2005 || Kitt Peak || Spacewatch ||  || align=right | 1.6 km || 
|-id=746 bgcolor=#d6d6d6
| 525746 ||  || — || September 26, 2005 || Kitt Peak || Spacewatch ||  || align=right | 2.8 km || 
|-id=747 bgcolor=#fefefe
| 525747 ||  || — || September 26, 2005 || Kitt Peak || Spacewatch ||  || align=right data-sort-value="0.66" | 660 m || 
|-id=748 bgcolor=#d6d6d6
| 525748 ||  || — || September 26, 2005 || Kitt Peak || Spacewatch ||  || align=right | 3.3 km || 
|-id=749 bgcolor=#fefefe
| 525749 ||  || — || September 26, 2005 || Palomar || NEAT ||  || align=right data-sort-value="0.73" | 730 m || 
|-id=750 bgcolor=#E9E9E9
| 525750 ||  || — || September 27, 2005 || Kitt Peak || Spacewatch ||  || align=right | 1.4 km || 
|-id=751 bgcolor=#fefefe
| 525751 ||  || — || September 14, 2005 || Kitt Peak || Spacewatch ||  || align=right data-sort-value="0.75" | 750 m || 
|-id=752 bgcolor=#E9E9E9
| 525752 ||  || — || September 24, 2005 || Kitt Peak || Spacewatch ||  || align=right | 1.2 km || 
|-id=753 bgcolor=#fefefe
| 525753 ||  || — || September 24, 2005 || Kitt Peak || Spacewatch ||  || align=right data-sort-value="0.51" | 510 m || 
|-id=754 bgcolor=#E9E9E9
| 525754 ||  || — || September 24, 2005 || Kitt Peak || Spacewatch ||  || align=right | 1.1 km || 
|-id=755 bgcolor=#fefefe
| 525755 ||  || — || September 24, 2005 || Kitt Peak || Spacewatch ||  || align=right data-sort-value="0.86" | 860 m || 
|-id=756 bgcolor=#E9E9E9
| 525756 ||  || — || September 24, 2005 || Kitt Peak || Spacewatch ||  || align=right | 1.4 km || 
|-id=757 bgcolor=#E9E9E9
| 525757 ||  || — || September 24, 2005 || Kitt Peak || Spacewatch ||  || align=right | 1.1 km || 
|-id=758 bgcolor=#fefefe
| 525758 ||  || — || September 24, 2005 || Kitt Peak || Spacewatch ||  || align=right data-sort-value="0.64" | 640 m || 
|-id=759 bgcolor=#E9E9E9
| 525759 ||  || — || September 25, 2005 || Palomar || NEAT ||  || align=right | 1.0 km || 
|-id=760 bgcolor=#E9E9E9
| 525760 ||  || — || September 25, 2005 || Kitt Peak || Spacewatch ||  || align=right | 1.8 km || 
|-id=761 bgcolor=#E9E9E9
| 525761 ||  || — || September 25, 2005 || Kitt Peak || Spacewatch ||  || align=right data-sort-value="0.69" | 690 m || 
|-id=762 bgcolor=#E9E9E9
| 525762 ||  || — || September 25, 2005 || Kitt Peak || Spacewatch ||  || align=right | 1.1 km || 
|-id=763 bgcolor=#E9E9E9
| 525763 ||  || — || September 25, 2005 || Kitt Peak || Spacewatch ||  || align=right | 1.3 km || 
|-id=764 bgcolor=#fefefe
| 525764 ||  || — || September 26, 2005 || Kitt Peak || Spacewatch ||  || align=right data-sort-value="0.53" | 530 m || 
|-id=765 bgcolor=#E9E9E9
| 525765 ||  || — || September 26, 2005 || Palomar || NEAT ||  || align=right | 1.3 km || 
|-id=766 bgcolor=#E9E9E9
| 525766 ||  || — || September 29, 2005 || Kitt Peak || Spacewatch ||  || align=right | 1.3 km || 
|-id=767 bgcolor=#E9E9E9
| 525767 ||  || — || September 29, 2005 || Mount Lemmon || Mount Lemmon Survey ||  || align=right | 1.2 km || 
|-id=768 bgcolor=#E9E9E9
| 525768 ||  || — || September 29, 2005 || Mount Lemmon || Mount Lemmon Survey ||  || align=right | 1.3 km || 
|-id=769 bgcolor=#E9E9E9
| 525769 ||  || — || September 29, 2005 || Mount Lemmon || Mount Lemmon Survey ||  || align=right | 1.6 km || 
|-id=770 bgcolor=#E9E9E9
| 525770 ||  || — || September 29, 2005 || Kitt Peak || Spacewatch ||  || align=right | 1.4 km || 
|-id=771 bgcolor=#E9E9E9
| 525771 ||  || — || September 25, 2005 || Kitt Peak || Spacewatch ||  || align=right | 1.1 km || 
|-id=772 bgcolor=#fefefe
| 525772 ||  || — || September 25, 2005 || Kitt Peak || Spacewatch ||  || align=right data-sort-value="0.53" | 530 m || 
|-id=773 bgcolor=#E9E9E9
| 525773 ||  || — || September 25, 2005 || Kitt Peak || Spacewatch ||  || align=right | 1.2 km || 
|-id=774 bgcolor=#fefefe
| 525774 ||  || — || September 25, 2005 || Kitt Peak || Spacewatch ||  || align=right data-sort-value="0.73" | 730 m || 
|-id=775 bgcolor=#d6d6d6
| 525775 ||  || — || September 25, 2005 || Kitt Peak || Spacewatch || EOS || align=right | 1.5 km || 
|-id=776 bgcolor=#E9E9E9
| 525776 ||  || — || September 25, 2005 || Kitt Peak || Spacewatch ||  || align=right | 1.2 km || 
|-id=777 bgcolor=#E9E9E9
| 525777 ||  || — || September 25, 2005 || Kitt Peak || Spacewatch ||  || align=right | 1.2 km || 
|-id=778 bgcolor=#fefefe
| 525778 ||  || — || September 25, 2005 || Kitt Peak || Spacewatch ||  || align=right data-sort-value="0.82" | 820 m || 
|-id=779 bgcolor=#fefefe
| 525779 ||  || — || September 26, 2005 || Kitt Peak || Spacewatch ||  || align=right data-sort-value="0.82" | 820 m || 
|-id=780 bgcolor=#E9E9E9
| 525780 ||  || — || September 26, 2005 || Kitt Peak || Spacewatch || EUN || align=right data-sort-value="0.92" | 920 m || 
|-id=781 bgcolor=#d6d6d6
| 525781 ||  || — || September 26, 2005 || Kitt Peak || Spacewatch ||  || align=right | 3.1 km || 
|-id=782 bgcolor=#E9E9E9
| 525782 ||  || — || September 27, 2005 || Kitt Peak || Spacewatch ||  || align=right | 1.1 km || 
|-id=783 bgcolor=#FA8072
| 525783 ||  || — || September 27, 2005 || Palomar || NEAT ||  || align=right data-sort-value="0.79" | 790 m || 
|-id=784 bgcolor=#E9E9E9
| 525784 ||  || — || September 29, 2005 || Kitt Peak || Spacewatch ||  || align=right data-sort-value="0.59" | 590 m || 
|-id=785 bgcolor=#E9E9E9
| 525785 ||  || — || September 13, 2005 || Kitt Peak || Spacewatch ||  || align=right data-sort-value="0.74" | 740 m || 
|-id=786 bgcolor=#E9E9E9
| 525786 ||  || — || September 29, 2005 || Kitt Peak || Spacewatch ||  || align=right | 1.0 km || 
|-id=787 bgcolor=#E9E9E9
| 525787 ||  || — || September 29, 2005 || Kitt Peak || Spacewatch ||  || align=right data-sort-value="0.92" | 920 m || 
|-id=788 bgcolor=#E9E9E9
| 525788 ||  || — || September 29, 2005 || Anderson Mesa || LONEOS ||  || align=right | 1.4 km || 
|-id=789 bgcolor=#fefefe
| 525789 ||  || — || September 29, 2005 || Kitt Peak || Spacewatch || H || align=right data-sort-value="0.51" | 510 m || 
|-id=790 bgcolor=#d6d6d6
| 525790 ||  || — || September 30, 2005 || Kitt Peak || Spacewatch ||  || align=right | 2.6 km || 
|-id=791 bgcolor=#E9E9E9
| 525791 ||  || — || September 30, 2005 || Mount Lemmon || Mount Lemmon Survey ||  || align=right data-sort-value="0.66" | 660 m || 
|-id=792 bgcolor=#d6d6d6
| 525792 ||  || — || September 30, 2005 || Kitt Peak || Spacewatch ||  || align=right | 2.1 km || 
|-id=793 bgcolor=#fefefe
| 525793 ||  || — || September 30, 2005 || Mount Lemmon || Mount Lemmon Survey ||  || align=right data-sort-value="0.74" | 740 m || 
|-id=794 bgcolor=#E9E9E9
| 525794 ||  || — || September 30, 2005 || Kitt Peak || Spacewatch || EUN || align=right data-sort-value="0.90" | 900 m || 
|-id=795 bgcolor=#E9E9E9
| 525795 ||  || — || September 30, 2005 || Palomar || NEAT || ADE || align=right | 1.6 km || 
|-id=796 bgcolor=#fefefe
| 525796 ||  || — || September 29, 2005 || Kitt Peak || Spacewatch ||  || align=right data-sort-value="0.73" | 730 m || 
|-id=797 bgcolor=#d6d6d6
| 525797 ||  || — || September 29, 2005 || Kitt Peak || Spacewatch ||  || align=right | 2.3 km || 
|-id=798 bgcolor=#d6d6d6
| 525798 ||  || — || September 29, 2005 || Mount Lemmon || Mount Lemmon Survey ||  || align=right | 2.0 km || 
|-id=799 bgcolor=#E9E9E9
| 525799 ||  || — || September 29, 2005 || Mount Lemmon || Mount Lemmon Survey ||  || align=right data-sort-value="0.98" | 980 m || 
|-id=800 bgcolor=#E9E9E9
| 525800 ||  || — || September 24, 2005 || Kitt Peak || Spacewatch ||  || align=right | 1.1 km || 
|}

525801–525900 

|-bgcolor=#fefefe
| 525801 ||  || — || September 29, 2005 || Kitt Peak || Spacewatch ||  || align=right data-sort-value="0.55" | 550 m || 
|-id=802 bgcolor=#fefefe
| 525802 ||  || — || September 29, 2005 || Kitt Peak || Spacewatch ||  || align=right data-sort-value="0.59" | 590 m || 
|-id=803 bgcolor=#E9E9E9
| 525803 ||  || — || September 30, 2005 || Kitt Peak || Spacewatch ||  || align=right | 1.4 km || 
|-id=804 bgcolor=#E9E9E9
| 525804 ||  || — || September 30, 2005 || Kitt Peak || Spacewatch ||  || align=right | 1.8 km || 
|-id=805 bgcolor=#E9E9E9
| 525805 ||  || — || September 30, 2005 || Mount Lemmon || Mount Lemmon Survey ||  || align=right data-sort-value="0.96" | 960 m || 
|-id=806 bgcolor=#fefefe
| 525806 ||  || — || September 30, 2005 || Mount Lemmon || Mount Lemmon Survey ||  || align=right data-sort-value="0.76" | 760 m || 
|-id=807 bgcolor=#E9E9E9
| 525807 ||  || — || September 30, 2005 || Kitt Peak || Spacewatch ||  || align=right | 1.1 km || 
|-id=808 bgcolor=#E9E9E9
| 525808 ||  || — || September 23, 2005 || Kitt Peak || Spacewatch ||  || align=right | 1.4 km || 
|-id=809 bgcolor=#d6d6d6
| 525809 ||  || — || August 29, 2005 || Kitt Peak || Spacewatch ||  || align=right | 2.8 km || 
|-id=810 bgcolor=#E9E9E9
| 525810 ||  || — || September 29, 2005 || Kitt Peak || Spacewatch ||  || align=right | 1.6 km || 
|-id=811 bgcolor=#fefefe
| 525811 ||  || — || September 29, 2005 || Kitt Peak || Spacewatch ||  || align=right data-sort-value="0.68" | 680 m || 
|-id=812 bgcolor=#fefefe
| 525812 ||  || — || September 29, 2005 || Kitt Peak || Spacewatch ||  || align=right data-sort-value="0.95" | 950 m || 
|-id=813 bgcolor=#d6d6d6
| 525813 ||  || — || September 30, 2005 || Kitt Peak || Spacewatch ||  || align=right | 2.2 km || 
|-id=814 bgcolor=#d6d6d6
| 525814 ||  || — || September 30, 2005 || Mount Lemmon || Mount Lemmon Survey ||  || align=right | 2.0 km || 
|-id=815 bgcolor=#C2E0FF
| 525815 ||  || — || September 25, 2005 || Apache Point || A. C. Becker, A. W. Puckett, J. Kubica || other TNO || align=right | 255 km || 
|-id=816 bgcolor=#C2E0FF
| 525816 ||  || — || September 26, 2005 || Apache Point || A. C. Becker, A. W. Puckett, J. Kubica || res4:7moon || align=right | 205 km || 
|-id=817 bgcolor=#E9E9E9
| 525817 ||  || — || September 23, 2005 || Catalina || CSS ||  || align=right | 1.2 km || 
|-id=818 bgcolor=#E9E9E9
| 525818 ||  || — || September 25, 2005 || Kitt Peak || Spacewatch ||  || align=right | 1.5 km || 
|-id=819 bgcolor=#E9E9E9
| 525819 ||  || — || September 29, 2005 || Mount Lemmon || Mount Lemmon Survey ||  || align=right data-sort-value="0.93" | 930 m || 
|-id=820 bgcolor=#fefefe
| 525820 ||  || — || September 29, 2005 || Mount Lemmon || Mount Lemmon Survey ||  || align=right data-sort-value="0.68" | 680 m || 
|-id=821 bgcolor=#fefefe
| 525821 ||  || — || September 30, 2005 || Mount Lemmon || Mount Lemmon Survey ||  || align=right data-sort-value="0.50" | 500 m || 
|-id=822 bgcolor=#E9E9E9
| 525822 ||  || — || October 1, 2005 || Catalina || CSS || (1547) || align=right | 1.2 km || 
|-id=823 bgcolor=#E9E9E9
| 525823 ||  || — || October 1, 2005 || Catalina || CSS ||  || align=right | 1.5 km || 
|-id=824 bgcolor=#FA8072
| 525824 ||  || — || August 30, 2005 || Socorro || LINEAR ||  || align=right | 1.6 km || 
|-id=825 bgcolor=#E9E9E9
| 525825 ||  || — || October 1, 2005 || Kitt Peak || Spacewatch ||  || align=right | 1.2 km || 
|-id=826 bgcolor=#d6d6d6
| 525826 ||  || — || October 1, 2005 || Kitt Peak || Spacewatch ||  || align=right | 2.8 km || 
|-id=827 bgcolor=#d6d6d6
| 525827 ||  || — || September 29, 2005 || Anderson Mesa || LONEOS ||  || align=right | 3.1 km || 
|-id=828 bgcolor=#d6d6d6
| 525828 ||  || — || October 1, 2005 || Mount Lemmon || Mount Lemmon Survey ||  || align=right | 2.5 km || 
|-id=829 bgcolor=#E9E9E9
| 525829 ||  || — || March 23, 2004 || Kitt Peak || Spacewatch ||  || align=right | 1.3 km || 
|-id=830 bgcolor=#E9E9E9
| 525830 ||  || — || October 3, 2005 || Catalina || CSS ||  || align=right | 1.5 km || 
|-id=831 bgcolor=#E9E9E9
| 525831 ||  || — || September 23, 2005 || Kitt Peak || Spacewatch ||  || align=right | 1.4 km || 
|-id=832 bgcolor=#E9E9E9
| 525832 ||  || — || October 1, 2005 || Kitt Peak || Spacewatch ||  || align=right | 1.00 km || 
|-id=833 bgcolor=#E9E9E9
| 525833 ||  || — || October 1, 2005 || Kitt Peak || Spacewatch ||  || align=right data-sort-value="0.82" | 820 m || 
|-id=834 bgcolor=#fefefe
| 525834 ||  || — || October 2, 2005 || Mount Lemmon || Mount Lemmon Survey ||  || align=right data-sort-value="0.51" | 510 m || 
|-id=835 bgcolor=#fefefe
| 525835 ||  || — || October 5, 2005 || Kitt Peak || Spacewatch ||  || align=right data-sort-value="0.77" | 770 m || 
|-id=836 bgcolor=#E9E9E9
| 525836 ||  || — || October 5, 2005 || Kitt Peak || Spacewatch ||  || align=right | 1.0 km || 
|-id=837 bgcolor=#E9E9E9
| 525837 ||  || — || September 27, 2005 || Kitt Peak || Spacewatch ||  || align=right | 1.1 km || 
|-id=838 bgcolor=#fefefe
| 525838 ||  || — || October 1, 2005 || Mount Lemmon || Mount Lemmon Survey ||  || align=right data-sort-value="0.72" | 720 m || 
|-id=839 bgcolor=#E9E9E9
| 525839 ||  || — || October 6, 2005 || Kitt Peak || Spacewatch ||  || align=right | 1.6 km || 
|-id=840 bgcolor=#d6d6d6
| 525840 ||  || — || October 7, 2005 || Mount Lemmon || Mount Lemmon Survey ||  || align=right | 3.1 km || 
|-id=841 bgcolor=#fefefe
| 525841 ||  || — || October 5, 2005 || Mount Lemmon || Mount Lemmon Survey ||  || align=right data-sort-value="0.56" | 560 m || 
|-id=842 bgcolor=#E9E9E9
| 525842 ||  || — || April 4, 2003 || Kitt Peak || Spacewatch ||  || align=right | 1.8 km || 
|-id=843 bgcolor=#E9E9E9
| 525843 ||  || — || October 7, 2005 || Mount Lemmon || Mount Lemmon Survey ||  || align=right data-sort-value="0.93" | 930 m || 
|-id=844 bgcolor=#d6d6d6
| 525844 ||  || — || September 3, 2005 || Catalina || CSS ||  || align=right | 4.0 km || 
|-id=845 bgcolor=#d6d6d6
| 525845 ||  || — || October 6, 2005 || Catalina || CSS ||  || align=right | 4.4 km || 
|-id=846 bgcolor=#fefefe
| 525846 ||  || — || October 7, 2005 || Mount Lemmon || Mount Lemmon Survey ||  || align=right data-sort-value="0.67" | 670 m || 
|-id=847 bgcolor=#fefefe
| 525847 ||  || — || October 3, 2005 || Kitt Peak || Spacewatch || H || align=right data-sort-value="0.49" | 490 m || 
|-id=848 bgcolor=#d6d6d6
| 525848 ||  || — || October 3, 2005 || Kitt Peak || Spacewatch ||  || align=right | 3.1 km || 
|-id=849 bgcolor=#E9E9E9
| 525849 ||  || — || October 3, 2005 || Kitt Peak || Spacewatch ||  || align=right | 1.3 km || 
|-id=850 bgcolor=#E9E9E9
| 525850 ||  || — || August 30, 2005 || Kitt Peak || Spacewatch ||  || align=right | 1.1 km || 
|-id=851 bgcolor=#E9E9E9
| 525851 ||  || — || October 6, 2005 || Kitt Peak || Spacewatch ||  || align=right | 1.0 km || 
|-id=852 bgcolor=#fefefe
| 525852 ||  || — || October 6, 2005 || Kitt Peak || Spacewatch ||  || align=right data-sort-value="0.63" | 630 m || 
|-id=853 bgcolor=#E9E9E9
| 525853 ||  || — || October 6, 2005 || Kitt Peak || Spacewatch ||  || align=right data-sort-value="0.67" | 670 m || 
|-id=854 bgcolor=#d6d6d6
| 525854 ||  || — || October 7, 2005 || Mount Lemmon || Mount Lemmon Survey ||  || align=right | 3.0 km || 
|-id=855 bgcolor=#d6d6d6
| 525855 ||  || — || September 1, 2005 || Kitt Peak || Spacewatch ||  || align=right | 2.3 km || 
|-id=856 bgcolor=#E9E9E9
| 525856 ||  || — || September 29, 2005 || Kitt Peak || Spacewatch ||  || align=right | 1.2 km || 
|-id=857 bgcolor=#fefefe
| 525857 ||  || — || October 7, 2005 || Kitt Peak || Spacewatch ||  || align=right data-sort-value="0.80" | 800 m || 
|-id=858 bgcolor=#d6d6d6
| 525858 ||  || — || October 7, 2005 || Kitt Peak || Spacewatch ||  || align=right | 3.4 km || 
|-id=859 bgcolor=#d6d6d6
| 525859 ||  || — || October 7, 2005 || Kitt Peak || Spacewatch ||  || align=right | 2.2 km || 
|-id=860 bgcolor=#E9E9E9
| 525860 ||  || — || September 27, 2005 || Kitt Peak || Spacewatch ||  || align=right | 1.5 km || 
|-id=861 bgcolor=#fefefe
| 525861 ||  || — || September 27, 2005 || Kitt Peak || Spacewatch ||  || align=right data-sort-value="0.53" | 530 m || 
|-id=862 bgcolor=#d6d6d6
| 525862 ||  || — || October 7, 2005 || Kitt Peak || Spacewatch ||  || align=right | 3.3 km || 
|-id=863 bgcolor=#E9E9E9
| 525863 ||  || — || September 30, 2005 || Mount Lemmon || Mount Lemmon Survey ||  || align=right | 1.2 km || 
|-id=864 bgcolor=#E9E9E9
| 525864 ||  || — || October 7, 2005 || Kitt Peak || Spacewatch || EUN || align=right data-sort-value="0.88" | 880 m || 
|-id=865 bgcolor=#fefefe
| 525865 ||  || — || October 7, 2005 || Kitt Peak || Spacewatch ||  || align=right data-sort-value="0.58" | 580 m || 
|-id=866 bgcolor=#E9E9E9
| 525866 ||  || — || October 7, 2005 || Kitt Peak || Spacewatch ||  || align=right | 1.0 km || 
|-id=867 bgcolor=#d6d6d6
| 525867 ||  || — || September 25, 2005 || Kitt Peak || Spacewatch ||  || align=right | 2.9 km || 
|-id=868 bgcolor=#d6d6d6
| 525868 ||  || — || October 2, 2005 || Mount Lemmon || Mount Lemmon Survey ||  || align=right | 2.2 km || 
|-id=869 bgcolor=#d6d6d6
| 525869 ||  || — || September 30, 2005 || Mount Lemmon || Mount Lemmon Survey || 7:4 || align=right | 2.7 km || 
|-id=870 bgcolor=#fefefe
| 525870 ||  || — || September 30, 2005 || Mount Lemmon || Mount Lemmon Survey || H || align=right data-sort-value="0.62" | 620 m || 
|-id=871 bgcolor=#d6d6d6
| 525871 ||  || — || October 10, 2005 || Catalina || CSS ||  || align=right | 3.1 km || 
|-id=872 bgcolor=#fefefe
| 525872 ||  || — || September 25, 2005 || Kitt Peak || Spacewatch ||  || align=right data-sort-value="0.47" | 470 m || 
|-id=873 bgcolor=#E9E9E9
| 525873 ||  || — || October 5, 2005 || Kitt Peak || Spacewatch ||  || align=right | 2.4 km || 
|-id=874 bgcolor=#d6d6d6
| 525874 ||  || — || October 6, 2005 || Kitt Peak || Spacewatch ||  || align=right | 2.6 km || 
|-id=875 bgcolor=#E9E9E9
| 525875 ||  || — || October 8, 2005 || Kitt Peak || Spacewatch ||  || align=right | 1.5 km || 
|-id=876 bgcolor=#d6d6d6
| 525876 ||  || — || October 8, 2005 || Kitt Peak || Spacewatch ||  || align=right | 2.6 km || 
|-id=877 bgcolor=#fefefe
| 525877 ||  || — || October 8, 2005 || Kitt Peak || Spacewatch ||  || align=right data-sort-value="0.66" | 660 m || 
|-id=878 bgcolor=#E9E9E9
| 525878 ||  || — || October 8, 2005 || Kitt Peak || Spacewatch || MAR || align=right data-sort-value="0.84" | 840 m || 
|-id=879 bgcolor=#E9E9E9
| 525879 ||  || — || October 8, 2005 || Kitt Peak || Spacewatch || HNS || align=right | 1.0 km || 
|-id=880 bgcolor=#E9E9E9
| 525880 ||  || — || October 8, 2005 || Kitt Peak || Spacewatch || EUN || align=right | 1.0 km || 
|-id=881 bgcolor=#E9E9E9
| 525881 ||  || — || October 8, 2005 || Kitt Peak || Spacewatch ||  || align=right | 1.1 km || 
|-id=882 bgcolor=#d6d6d6
| 525882 ||  || — || October 8, 2005 || Kitt Peak || Spacewatch ||  || align=right | 2.6 km || 
|-id=883 bgcolor=#E9E9E9
| 525883 ||  || — || October 9, 2005 || Kitt Peak || Spacewatch ||  || align=right | 1.4 km || 
|-id=884 bgcolor=#E9E9E9
| 525884 ||  || — || October 10, 2005 || Kitt Peak || Spacewatch ||  || align=right | 1.5 km || 
|-id=885 bgcolor=#d6d6d6
| 525885 ||  || — || October 7, 2005 || Mount Lemmon || Mount Lemmon Survey ||  || align=right | 2.8 km || 
|-id=886 bgcolor=#E9E9E9
| 525886 ||  || — || September 26, 2005 || Kitt Peak || Spacewatch ||  || align=right | 1.5 km || 
|-id=887 bgcolor=#d6d6d6
| 525887 ||  || — || October 9, 2005 || Kitt Peak || Spacewatch ||  || align=right | 2.5 km || 
|-id=888 bgcolor=#fefefe
| 525888 ||  || — || October 9, 2005 || Kitt Peak || Spacewatch ||  || align=right data-sort-value="0.61" | 610 m || 
|-id=889 bgcolor=#E9E9E9
| 525889 ||  || — || October 9, 2005 || Kitt Peak || Spacewatch ||  || align=right | 1.2 km || 
|-id=890 bgcolor=#d6d6d6
| 525890 ||  || — || October 9, 2005 || Kitt Peak || Spacewatch || EOS || align=right | 1.6 km || 
|-id=891 bgcolor=#E9E9E9
| 525891 ||  || — || October 9, 2005 || Kitt Peak || Spacewatch ||  || align=right | 1.1 km || 
|-id=892 bgcolor=#d6d6d6
| 525892 ||  || — || October 9, 2005 || Kitt Peak || Spacewatch ||  || align=right | 2.1 km || 
|-id=893 bgcolor=#E9E9E9
| 525893 ||  || — || October 9, 2005 || Kitt Peak || Spacewatch || MIS || align=right | 2.4 km || 
|-id=894 bgcolor=#d6d6d6
| 525894 ||  || — || October 9, 2005 || Kitt Peak || Spacewatch || EUP || align=right | 3.8 km || 
|-id=895 bgcolor=#E9E9E9
| 525895 ||  || — || October 9, 2005 || Kitt Peak || Spacewatch ||  || align=right | 1.3 km || 
|-id=896 bgcolor=#E9E9E9
| 525896 ||  || — || October 1, 2005 || Kitt Peak || Spacewatch ||  || align=right | 1.1 km || 
|-id=897 bgcolor=#E9E9E9
| 525897 ||  || — || April 22, 2004 || Campo Imperatore || CINEOS ||  || align=right | 1.4 km || 
|-id=898 bgcolor=#fefefe
| 525898 ||  || — || October 3, 2005 || Catalina || CSS ||  || align=right data-sort-value="0.68" | 680 m || 
|-id=899 bgcolor=#fefefe
| 525899 ||  || — || March 29, 2000 || Kitt Peak || Spacewatch ||  || align=right data-sort-value="0.86" | 860 m || 
|-id=900 bgcolor=#fefefe
| 525900 ||  || — || April 24, 2004 || Kitt Peak || Spacewatch ||  || align=right data-sort-value="0.77" | 770 m || 
|}

525901–526000 

|-bgcolor=#d6d6d6
| 525901 ||  || — || October 11, 2005 || Kitt Peak || Spacewatch ||  || align=right | 2.2 km || 
|-id=902 bgcolor=#d6d6d6
| 525902 ||  || — || October 11, 2005 || Anderson Mesa || LONEOS || TIR || align=right | 2.4 km || 
|-id=903 bgcolor=#E9E9E9
| 525903 ||  || — || October 1, 2005 || Kitt Peak || Spacewatch ||  || align=right data-sort-value="0.62" | 620 m || 
|-id=904 bgcolor=#fefefe
| 525904 ||  || — || October 1, 2005 || Mount Lemmon || Mount Lemmon Survey ||  || align=right data-sort-value="0.71" | 710 m || 
|-id=905 bgcolor=#E9E9E9
| 525905 ||  || — || October 1, 2005 || Mount Lemmon || Mount Lemmon Survey ||  || align=right data-sort-value="0.98" | 980 m || 
|-id=906 bgcolor=#d6d6d6
| 525906 ||  || — || October 1, 2005 || Mount Lemmon || Mount Lemmon Survey ||  || align=right | 2.5 km || 
|-id=907 bgcolor=#E9E9E9
| 525907 ||  || — || October 1, 2005 || Catalina || CSS ||  || align=right | 1.7 km || 
|-id=908 bgcolor=#d6d6d6
| 525908 ||  || — || October 4, 2005 || Mount Lemmon || Mount Lemmon Survey ||  || align=right | 3.0 km || 
|-id=909 bgcolor=#E9E9E9
| 525909 ||  || — || October 6, 2005 || Mount Lemmon || Mount Lemmon Survey ||  || align=right | 1.3 km || 
|-id=910 bgcolor=#E9E9E9
| 525910 ||  || — || October 1, 2005 || Mount Lemmon || Mount Lemmon Survey ||  || align=right data-sort-value="0.90" | 900 m || 
|-id=911 bgcolor=#d6d6d6
| 525911 ||  || — || October 22, 2005 || Kitt Peak || Spacewatch ||  || align=right | 2.3 km || 
|-id=912 bgcolor=#E9E9E9
| 525912 ||  || — || October 22, 2005 || Kitt Peak || Spacewatch ||  || align=right | 1.1 km || 
|-id=913 bgcolor=#E9E9E9
| 525913 ||  || — || October 22, 2005 || Kitt Peak || Spacewatch || BRG || align=right | 1.2 km || 
|-id=914 bgcolor=#E9E9E9
| 525914 ||  || — || October 23, 2005 || Kitt Peak || Spacewatch ||  || align=right | 1.2 km || 
|-id=915 bgcolor=#d6d6d6
| 525915 ||  || — || October 24, 2005 || Kitt Peak || Spacewatch ||  || align=right | 2.5 km || 
|-id=916 bgcolor=#E9E9E9
| 525916 ||  || — || October 24, 2005 || Kitt Peak || Spacewatch ||  || align=right data-sort-value="0.70" | 700 m || 
|-id=917 bgcolor=#E9E9E9
| 525917 ||  || — || October 24, 2005 || Kitt Peak || Spacewatch ||  || align=right | 1.7 km || 
|-id=918 bgcolor=#E9E9E9
| 525918 ||  || — || October 24, 2005 || Kitt Peak || Spacewatch ||  || align=right | 1.3 km || 
|-id=919 bgcolor=#E9E9E9
| 525919 ||  || — || October 22, 2005 || Kitt Peak || Spacewatch ||  || align=right | 1.7 km || 
|-id=920 bgcolor=#E9E9E9
| 525920 ||  || — || October 22, 2005 || Kitt Peak || Spacewatch ||  || align=right | 1.4 km || 
|-id=921 bgcolor=#d6d6d6
| 525921 ||  || — || October 6, 2005 || Anderson Mesa || LONEOS ||  || align=right | 2.9 km || 
|-id=922 bgcolor=#d6d6d6
| 525922 ||  || — || October 23, 2005 || Catalina || CSS ||  || align=right | 2.6 km || 
|-id=923 bgcolor=#E9E9E9
| 525923 ||  || — || October 10, 2005 || Catalina || CSS ||  || align=right | 1.3 km || 
|-id=924 bgcolor=#d6d6d6
| 525924 ||  || — || October 24, 2005 || Kitt Peak || Spacewatch ||  || align=right | 3.6 km || 
|-id=925 bgcolor=#E9E9E9
| 525925 ||  || — || October 24, 2005 || Kitt Peak || Spacewatch ||  || align=right | 1.4 km || 
|-id=926 bgcolor=#E9E9E9
| 525926 ||  || — || September 30, 2005 || Catalina || CSS ||  || align=right | 1.5 km || 
|-id=927 bgcolor=#E9E9E9
| 525927 ||  || — || October 11, 2005 || Kitt Peak || Spacewatch ||  || align=right | 1.5 km || 
|-id=928 bgcolor=#d6d6d6
| 525928 ||  || — || October 25, 2005 || Mount Lemmon || Mount Lemmon Survey ||  || align=right | 2.9 km || 
|-id=929 bgcolor=#E9E9E9
| 525929 ||  || — || October 22, 2005 || Kitt Peak || Spacewatch ||  || align=right | 1.6 km || 
|-id=930 bgcolor=#fefefe
| 525930 ||  || — || October 22, 2005 || Kitt Peak || Spacewatch ||  || align=right data-sort-value="0.46" | 460 m || 
|-id=931 bgcolor=#d6d6d6
| 525931 ||  || — || October 22, 2005 || Kitt Peak || Spacewatch ||  || align=right | 2.5 km || 
|-id=932 bgcolor=#E9E9E9
| 525932 ||  || — || October 22, 2005 || Kitt Peak || Spacewatch ||  || align=right | 1.4 km || 
|-id=933 bgcolor=#FA8072
| 525933 ||  || — || October 22, 2005 || Kitt Peak || Spacewatch ||  || align=right | 1.2 km || 
|-id=934 bgcolor=#fefefe
| 525934 ||  || — || October 22, 2005 || Kitt Peak || Spacewatch ||  || align=right data-sort-value="0.46" | 460 m || 
|-id=935 bgcolor=#E9E9E9
| 525935 ||  || — || October 22, 2005 || Kitt Peak || Spacewatch ||  || align=right | 1.5 km || 
|-id=936 bgcolor=#E9E9E9
| 525936 ||  || — || October 22, 2005 || Kitt Peak || Spacewatch ||  || align=right | 1.5 km || 
|-id=937 bgcolor=#E9E9E9
| 525937 ||  || — || October 22, 2005 || Kitt Peak || Spacewatch ||  || align=right data-sort-value="0.94" | 940 m || 
|-id=938 bgcolor=#E9E9E9
| 525938 ||  || — || October 22, 2005 || Kitt Peak || Spacewatch ||  || align=right | 1.6 km || 
|-id=939 bgcolor=#E9E9E9
| 525939 ||  || — || October 22, 2005 || Kitt Peak || Spacewatch || (1547) || align=right | 1.5 km || 
|-id=940 bgcolor=#E9E9E9
| 525940 ||  || — || October 22, 2005 || Kitt Peak || Spacewatch ||  || align=right | 1.1 km || 
|-id=941 bgcolor=#E9E9E9
| 525941 ||  || — || October 22, 2005 || Kitt Peak || Spacewatch ||  || align=right | 1.3 km || 
|-id=942 bgcolor=#E9E9E9
| 525942 ||  || — || October 22, 2005 || Kitt Peak || Spacewatch ||  || align=right | 1.2 km || 
|-id=943 bgcolor=#E9E9E9
| 525943 ||  || — || October 22, 2005 || Kitt Peak || Spacewatch ||  || align=right data-sort-value="0.88" | 880 m || 
|-id=944 bgcolor=#E9E9E9
| 525944 ||  || — || October 22, 2005 || Kitt Peak || Spacewatch ||  || align=right | 1.5 km || 
|-id=945 bgcolor=#fefefe
| 525945 ||  || — || October 22, 2005 || Kitt Peak || Spacewatch ||  || align=right data-sort-value="0.92" | 920 m || 
|-id=946 bgcolor=#fefefe
| 525946 ||  || — || September 30, 2005 || Mount Lemmon || Mount Lemmon Survey ||  || align=right data-sort-value="0.44" | 440 m || 
|-id=947 bgcolor=#E9E9E9
| 525947 ||  || — || October 22, 2005 || Palomar || NEAT ||  || align=right | 1.4 km || 
|-id=948 bgcolor=#d6d6d6
| 525948 ||  || — || October 24, 2005 || Kitt Peak || Spacewatch ||  || align=right | 3.3 km || 
|-id=949 bgcolor=#E9E9E9
| 525949 ||  || — || October 24, 2005 || Kitt Peak || Spacewatch ||  || align=right | 1.2 km || 
|-id=950 bgcolor=#FA8072
| 525950 ||  || — || October 24, 2005 || Anderson Mesa || LONEOS || H || align=right data-sort-value="0.52" | 520 m || 
|-id=951 bgcolor=#fefefe
| 525951 ||  || — || October 24, 2005 || Kitt Peak || Spacewatch ||  || align=right data-sort-value="0.91" | 910 m || 
|-id=952 bgcolor=#fefefe
| 525952 ||  || — || October 24, 2005 || Kitt Peak || Spacewatch ||  || align=right data-sort-value="0.80" | 800 m || 
|-id=953 bgcolor=#E9E9E9
| 525953 ||  || — || October 24, 2005 || Kitt Peak || Spacewatch ||  || align=right | 1.5 km || 
|-id=954 bgcolor=#E9E9E9
| 525954 ||  || — || October 24, 2005 || Kitt Peak || Spacewatch ||  || align=right | 1.3 km || 
|-id=955 bgcolor=#fefefe
| 525955 ||  || — || October 25, 2005 || Kitt Peak || Spacewatch ||  || align=right data-sort-value="0.49" | 490 m || 
|-id=956 bgcolor=#d6d6d6
| 525956 ||  || — || October 11, 2005 || Kitt Peak || Spacewatch ||  || align=right | 2.1 km || 
|-id=957 bgcolor=#d6d6d6
| 525957 ||  || — || September 30, 2005 || Mount Lemmon || Mount Lemmon Survey ||  || align=right | 2.2 km || 
|-id=958 bgcolor=#E9E9E9
| 525958 ||  || — || October 25, 2005 || Mount Lemmon || Mount Lemmon Survey ||  || align=right | 1.7 km || 
|-id=959 bgcolor=#d6d6d6
| 525959 ||  || — || October 25, 2005 || Mount Lemmon || Mount Lemmon Survey ||  || align=right | 2.4 km || 
|-id=960 bgcolor=#E9E9E9
| 525960 ||  || — || October 25, 2005 || Mount Lemmon || Mount Lemmon Survey ||  || align=right data-sort-value="0.66" | 660 m || 
|-id=961 bgcolor=#fefefe
| 525961 ||  || — || October 25, 2005 || Mount Lemmon || Mount Lemmon Survey ||  || align=right data-sort-value="0.70" | 700 m || 
|-id=962 bgcolor=#d6d6d6
| 525962 ||  || — || October 1, 2005 || Mount Lemmon || Mount Lemmon Survey ||  || align=right | 2.4 km || 
|-id=963 bgcolor=#d6d6d6
| 525963 ||  || — || October 26, 2005 || Kitt Peak || Spacewatch ||  || align=right | 2.6 km || 
|-id=964 bgcolor=#E9E9E9
| 525964 ||  || — || October 26, 2005 || Kitt Peak || Spacewatch ||  || align=right data-sort-value="0.75" | 750 m || 
|-id=965 bgcolor=#E9E9E9
| 525965 ||  || — || October 26, 2005 || Kitt Peak || Spacewatch ||  || align=right data-sort-value="0.96" | 960 m || 
|-id=966 bgcolor=#E9E9E9
| 525966 ||  || — || October 24, 2005 || Kitt Peak || Spacewatch || JUN || align=right data-sort-value="0.75" | 750 m || 
|-id=967 bgcolor=#d6d6d6
| 525967 ||  || — || October 9, 2005 || Kitt Peak || Spacewatch ||  || align=right | 2.6 km || 
|-id=968 bgcolor=#d6d6d6
| 525968 ||  || — || October 24, 2005 || Kitt Peak || Spacewatch || Tj (2.99) || align=right | 2.4 km || 
|-id=969 bgcolor=#fefefe
| 525969 ||  || — || October 24, 2005 || Kitt Peak || Spacewatch ||  || align=right data-sort-value="0.42" | 420 m || 
|-id=970 bgcolor=#d6d6d6
| 525970 ||  || — || October 24, 2005 || Kitt Peak || Spacewatch ||  || align=right | 2.6 km || 
|-id=971 bgcolor=#d6d6d6
| 525971 ||  || — || October 24, 2005 || Kitt Peak || Spacewatch ||  || align=right | 2.6 km || 
|-id=972 bgcolor=#d6d6d6
| 525972 ||  || — || October 24, 2005 || Kitt Peak || Spacewatch ||  || align=right | 2.7 km || 
|-id=973 bgcolor=#d6d6d6
| 525973 ||  || — || October 24, 2005 || Kitt Peak || Spacewatch ||  || align=right | 2.4 km || 
|-id=974 bgcolor=#E9E9E9
| 525974 ||  || — || October 24, 2005 || Kitt Peak || Spacewatch ||  || align=right | 1.4 km || 
|-id=975 bgcolor=#E9E9E9
| 525975 ||  || — || October 24, 2005 || Kitt Peak || Spacewatch ||  || align=right | 1.2 km || 
|-id=976 bgcolor=#E9E9E9
| 525976 ||  || — || October 24, 2005 || Kitt Peak || Spacewatch || JUN || align=right data-sort-value="0.77" | 770 m || 
|-id=977 bgcolor=#d6d6d6
| 525977 ||  || — || October 24, 2005 || Kitt Peak || Spacewatch || 7:4 || align=right | 3.4 km || 
|-id=978 bgcolor=#E9E9E9
| 525978 ||  || — || October 24, 2005 || Kitt Peak || Spacewatch ||  || align=right | 1.6 km || 
|-id=979 bgcolor=#E9E9E9
| 525979 ||  || — || October 24, 2005 || Kitt Peak || Spacewatch ||  || align=right | 1.5 km || 
|-id=980 bgcolor=#fefefe
| 525980 ||  || — || October 24, 2005 || Kitt Peak || Spacewatch ||  || align=right data-sort-value="0.85" | 850 m || 
|-id=981 bgcolor=#E9E9E9
| 525981 ||  || — || October 25, 2005 || Mount Lemmon || Mount Lemmon Survey ||  || align=right | 1.5 km || 
|-id=982 bgcolor=#E9E9E9
| 525982 ||  || — || October 25, 2005 || Mount Lemmon || Mount Lemmon Survey ||  || align=right data-sort-value="0.92" | 920 m || 
|-id=983 bgcolor=#d6d6d6
| 525983 ||  || — || October 27, 2005 || Mount Lemmon || Mount Lemmon Survey ||  || align=right | 3.0 km || 
|-id=984 bgcolor=#fefefe
| 525984 ||  || — || October 27, 2005 || Mount Lemmon || Mount Lemmon Survey ||  || align=right data-sort-value="0.57" | 570 m || 
|-id=985 bgcolor=#E9E9E9
| 525985 ||  || — || October 27, 2005 || Mount Lemmon || Mount Lemmon Survey ||  || align=right | 1.3 km || 
|-id=986 bgcolor=#d6d6d6
| 525986 ||  || — || October 27, 2005 || Kitt Peak || Spacewatch ||  || align=right | 2.6 km || 
|-id=987 bgcolor=#d6d6d6
| 525987 ||  || — || October 24, 2005 || Kitt Peak || Spacewatch ||  || align=right | 3.3 km || 
|-id=988 bgcolor=#E9E9E9
| 525988 ||  || — || October 25, 2005 || Kitt Peak || Spacewatch ||  || align=right | 1.4 km || 
|-id=989 bgcolor=#E9E9E9
| 525989 ||  || — || October 25, 2005 || Kitt Peak || Spacewatch ||  || align=right | 1.2 km || 
|-id=990 bgcolor=#E9E9E9
| 525990 ||  || — || September 30, 2005 || Mount Lemmon || Mount Lemmon Survey ||  || align=right data-sort-value="0.69" | 690 m || 
|-id=991 bgcolor=#E9E9E9
| 525991 ||  || — || October 27, 2005 || Kitt Peak || Spacewatch ||  || align=right | 1.4 km || 
|-id=992 bgcolor=#fefefe
| 525992 ||  || — || October 27, 2005 || Kitt Peak || Spacewatch ||  || align=right data-sort-value="0.87" | 870 m || 
|-id=993 bgcolor=#fefefe
| 525993 ||  || — || October 22, 2005 || Kitt Peak || Spacewatch ||  || align=right data-sort-value="0.58" | 580 m || 
|-id=994 bgcolor=#E9E9E9
| 525994 ||  || — || October 25, 2005 || Kitt Peak || Spacewatch ||  || align=right | 1.6 km || 
|-id=995 bgcolor=#d6d6d6
| 525995 ||  || — || October 25, 2005 || Kitt Peak || Spacewatch ||  || align=right | 3.3 km || 
|-id=996 bgcolor=#E9E9E9
| 525996 ||  || — || October 25, 2005 || Kitt Peak || Spacewatch ||  || align=right | 1.1 km || 
|-id=997 bgcolor=#E9E9E9
| 525997 ||  || — || October 25, 2005 || Kitt Peak || Spacewatch ||  || align=right data-sort-value="0.96" | 960 m || 
|-id=998 bgcolor=#E9E9E9
| 525998 ||  || — || October 25, 2005 || Kitt Peak || Spacewatch ||  || align=right | 1.5 km || 
|-id=999 bgcolor=#E9E9E9
| 525999 ||  || — || October 25, 2005 || Kitt Peak || Spacewatch ||  || align=right data-sort-value="0.70" | 700 m || 
|-id=000 bgcolor=#E9E9E9
| 526000 ||  || — || October 25, 2005 || Mount Lemmon || Mount Lemmon Survey ||  || align=right | 1.1 km || 
|}

References

External links 
 Discovery Circumstances: Numbered Minor Planets (525001)–(530000) (IAU Minor Planet Center)

0525